= Outline of stagecraft =

Technical aspect of theatrical, film, video production

The following outline is provided as an overview of and topical guide to stagecraft:

Stagecraft – technical aspect of theatrical, film, and video production. Stagecraft is distinct from the wider scope of scenography. Considered a technical rather than an artistic field, it relates primarily to the practical implementation of a designer's artistic vision.

== Essence of stagecraft ==
Stagecraft

- Cue (theatrical)
- Curtain Call
- Rehearsal
- Stage
- Theatrical constraints
- Theatrical superstitions
- Technical rehearsal
- Technical week
- Performance

== Branches of stagecraft ==
=== Lighting ===
Lighting design involves the process of determining the size, intensity, shape, and color of light for a given scene. Typical work includes hanging, focusing, procurement and maintenance of fixtures, as well as some aspects of show control.

- Electrician (theatre)
- Color temperature
- Intelligent lighting - LED stage lighting - Light plot - Stage lighting - Stage lighting instrument - Stage lighting accessories

=== Audio ===
Sound design, which can include musical underscoring, vocal and instrument mixing as well as theatrical sound effects.

- Audio engineering
- Microphone - Sound - Smiley face curve

=== Carpentry ===
Set construction or Carpentry is the process of building scenery, which can include scenic painting and soft goods (drapes and stage curtains). Scenic carpentry also covers mechanics: the design, engineering and operation of Fly system scenery or flying of performers and mechanised scenic elements.

- Carpenter (theatre)
- Counterweight fly system - Rail (theater) - Rigging (theatre) - Scene shop -

Scenery wagon - show control - Theatrical scenery

=== Props ===
Theatrical property (Props), includes furnishings, set dressings, and all items large and small which cannot be classified as scenery, electrics or wardrobe. Some crossover may apply. Props handled by actors are known as hand props, and props which are kept in an actor's costume are known as personal props.

=== Costumes ===
Costume construction (Costuming), known as the Wardrobe department, is responsible for costume design, construction and the procurement and maintenance of costumes.

- Make-up artist - Wigs

== Positions in Stagecraft ==
=== Management ===
- Stage management
- Technical director
- Production management (theatre)
- House management
- Company management

=== Technical ===
- Carpenter (theatre)
- Electrician (theatre)
- Fly crew
- Property master
- Pyrotechnician
- Running crew
- Spotlight operator
- Stagehand
- Theatrical Technician
- Technical crew
- Wardrobe supervisor

=== Design ===
- Costume Designer
- Lighting designer
- Scenic designer
- Sound Designer
- Video design

== Stagecraft organizations ==
- International Alliance of Theatrical Stage Employees
- PLASA
- United Scenic Artists
- United States Institute for Theatre Technology

== History of stagecraft ==
History of stagecraft

- 2007 Broadway stagehand strike

== General stagecraft concepts ==
Parts of a theatre

=== Terminology ===
- Bobbinet - McCandless method - Spike (stagecraft) - Tannoy
- Theatrical production
- Film production
- Video production

=== Important technology ===
- ACN - C-Clamp (stagecraft) - Color gel - Color scroller - Dimmer - DMX512
- Fog machine - Followspot - Footlight - Gobo (lighting) - Haze machine - Parabolic aluminized reflector light - Safety curtain - XLR connector

=== Venues ===
- Broadway theatre - Regional theatre in the United States - community theatre

== Persons influential in the field of stagecraft ==
- Dale Ferguson - Designer
- Neil Peter Jampolis - Lighting and Set
- Samuel James Hume - Organizer of the first exhibition of stagecraft in the United States.

=== Costume Designers ===
- Jane Greenwood - Paul Tazewell

=== Lighting Designers ===
List of lighting designers

- Andrew Bridge - Howell Binkley - Luc Lafortune - Mark Henderson - Nigel Levings - Paul Gallo - Richard Riddell - Tharon Musser

=== Set Designers ===
- Allen Moyer - Carl Toms - Donald Oenslager - John Conklin - John Napier

=== Sound Designers ===
- Paul Arditti

=== Technical Directors ===
- Wayne Nakasone

== Awards ==
- Dora Mavor Moore Award
- TEC Awards
- Tony Award for Best Stage Technician
- Laurence Olivier Award for Best Set Designer

== Stagecraft lists ==
- List of theatre personnel
- Running crew
