= Outline of performing arts =

Art forms in which the body is used to convey artistic expression

The following outline is provided as an overview of and topical guide to performing arts:

The performing arts are arts such as music, dance, and drama which are performed for an audience. They are different from the visual arts, which involve the use of paint, canvas or various materials to create physical or static art objects. Performing arts include a range of disciplines which are performed in front of a live audience, including theatre, music, and dance.

== What are performing arts? ==
The performing arts as a whole can be described as all of the following:

- Art – aesthetic expression for presentation or performance, and the work produced from this activity.
  - One of the arts – an outlet of human expression that is influenced by culture and which in turn helps to change culture. The performing arts are a physical manifestation of the internal human creative impulse.
  - A form of storytelling that has been practiced since the beginning of time.

== Common performing arts ==
- Acrobatics – performance of extraordinary feats of balance, agility and motor coordination.
- Baton twirling
  - Majorettes
- Busking
- Circus
  - Circus arts
- Comedy
- Dance – art of movement of the body, usually rhythmically and to music, using prescribed or improvised steps and gestures. "A dance" is any one prescribed sequence of such movements, or the music to which it is performed, or an event at which it takes place.
  - Competitive dance
    - Dance squad
  - Ice dance
- Drama
- Erotica
- Free skating
- Ice show
- Juggling
- Magic
- Marching arts
  - Color guard
  - Drum and bugle corps
  - Indoor percussion ensemble
  - Marching band
  - Pep band
  - Winter guard
- Music
  - Jazz
  - Opera – performance where art, architecture, music, theater, text, and cloth designing are put together to present a story to the audience
- Pornography
- Puppetry
- Storytelling – conveying of events in words, images and sounds, often by improvisation or embellishment. Stories or narratives have been shared in every culture as a means of entertainment, education, cultural preservation and in order to instill moral values.
  - Acting
  - Film
  - Television
  - Theatre
    - Musical theatre
    - Plays
- Ventriloquism

== History of performing arts ==
- History of acrobatics
- History of busking
- History of circus
- History of dance
  - History of ballet
- History of film
- History of juggling
- History of magic
- History of marching bands
- History of music
- History of opera
- History of theatre

== Contents of a work of performing art ==
- Role
  - Dual role
  - Stock character
  - Title role
- Special effects
- Stage combat

== Venue types ==
- Arena
- Arts centre
- Auditorium
- Cabaret
- Cultural center
- Dance venues
  - Ballroom
  - Dance club
  - Dance hall
  - Dance studio
- Music venues
  - Bandstand
  - Bar
  - Coffeehouse
  - Concert hall
  - Jazz club
  - Live house
  - Nightclub
  - Opera house
  - Performing arts center
  - Pub
- Stadium
- Stage
  - Amphitheatre
  - Black box theater
  - Proscenium
  - Site-specific theatre
  - Theatre in the round
  - Thrust stage
  - Traverse stage
- Theater (structure)

== Participants ==
- Actor
  - Character actor – one who predominantly plays a particular type of role rather than leading ones. Character actor roles can range from bit parts to secondary leads.
  - Leading actor
- Artistic director
- Assistant stage manager
- Audience
- Audio engineer
- Ballet master
- Bandleader
- Call boy
- Carpenter
- Charge scenic artist
- Choreographer
- Composer
- Conductor
- Costume designer
- Dancer
- Dramaturge
- Dresser
- Electrician
- Film director
- Fly crew
- Light board operator
- Lighting designer
- Lighting technician
- Master electrician
- Movement director
- Music director
- Musician
  - Singer
- Playwright
- Production manager
- Production team
- Property master
- Rigger
- Running crew
- Scenographer
- Scriptwriter
- Set designer
- Sound designer
- Spotlight operator
- Stagehand
- Stage manager
- Technical director
- Theater manager
- Theatre director
- Theatrical producer
- Theatrical technician
- Usher
- Wardrobe supervisor

== Production activities ==
- Audition
- Casting
- Choreography
- Costume design
- Dramaturgy
- House management
- Musical composition
- Rehearsal
- Scenic design
- Scenic painting
- Set construction
- Sound design
- Stagecraft
- Stage lighting
- Staging
