= List of theatre personnel =

This is a list of jobs which can be found at a theatre. Theatres vary widely, so people sometimes fill multiple roles, and roles sometimes have to do additional tasks due to the particular theatre or production. However, an incomplete list of roles are listed below.

== Pre-production ==
These positions are responsible for the development of a production from conception to performance. Typically, although there will be significant involvement in the fabrication and initial development, these positions will not be involved in the performances.

- Choreographer
- Composer
- Costume designer
- Director
- Dramaturge
- Fight director
- Intimacy coordinator
- Lighting designer
- Make up artist
- Movement director
- Music director
- Playwright
- Projection designer
- Producer
- Scenic designer
- Scenographer
- Set designer
- Sound designer

== Production ==
These positions are responsible for the fabrication of a production prior to the initial performance. Although there will be significant involvement in initial development of a production, some of these positions may not be involved once performances before an audience begin.

- Actor
- Audio engineer
- Backstage
- Carpenter and master carpenter
- Charge artist
- Dancer
- Electrician
- Fight director
- Front of house manager
- Intimacy director
- Hair and wig designer
- Lighting technician
- Master electrician
- Musician
- Painters
- Playbill writer
- Production manager
- Property master
- Publicist
- Sound technician (A1)
- Sound technician (A2)
- Scenic artist
- Stagehands
- Stage manager
- Assistant stage manager (ASM)
- Technical director
- Theatrical technician
- Wardrobe supervisor

== Theatre staff ==
These staff members are responsible for running a theatre group from year to year. Their objective is to facilitate the success of individual productions. Staff positions help ensure good attendance in safe facilities. They help ensure the theatre remains financially solvent, that it is well run, and that it is perceived as an asset to the community it serves.

- Artistic director
- Call boy, a stagehand who alerts actors and actresses of their entrances during a performance
- Company manager
- Costume shop manager
- Crew chief
- Director of audience services
- Director of development
- Director of production or production manager
- Director of special events
- Dramaturge
- Dresser
- Fly crew
- House manager
- Janitor
- Light board operator
- Literary manager
- Marketing director
- Music director
- Public relations director
- Spotlight operator
- Stage crew
- Technical director
- Theater manager, the administrator of the theater, also called general manager, managing director, or intendant (UK English); often also has the responsibilities of an artistic director
- Ticketing agent
- Usher
- Wardrobe supervisor and crew

== See also ==
- Character actor
- Pantomime dame
- Stagehand
- Running crew
