= Running crew =

Members of the technical crew in a theatrical production

In theatre, the running crew (also run crew) are members of the technical crew who supervise and operate ("run") the various technical aspects of the production during a performance. While the "technical crew" includes all persons other than performers involved with the production, such as those who build and take down the sets and place the lighting, the term "running crew" is generally limited to those who work during an actual performance.

The term is typically not applied to crew or department heads, although there are exceptions. The running crew may include performers if they also function in technical capacities while offstage.

== Crew positions ==
A typical running crew will include any or all of the following positions, depending on the nature and size of the production, and the complexity of the technical requirements. Each position is organized by the most common title; depending on the country, type of production, and producing organization, different titles may be used for the same position. (This also depends on what the director classifies it all as.)

=== Stage management ===
- Assistant stage manager: Assists the stage manager in their duties. Generally, one assistant stage manager is in charge of running backstage operations during a show.
- Props Master: Responsible for maintenance and placement of hand props before scenes as well as their subsequent retrieval after the scene. Additionally, props masters run the properties department and work to ensure that all props exist within the theater and are easily locatable, should they not already be where they need to be (i.e. maintaining a prop table).
- Assistant Props Master: Assists the prop master in their duties usually taking one side of the stage during a performance.
- Call boy: responsible for alerting actors and actresses of their entrances in time for them to appear on stage, on cue.

=== Lighting ===
- Light board operator: operates the lighting control system by activating lighting cues at the direction of the stage manager. Sometimes this is integrated with the show control system.
- Deck Electrician: responsible for placing, connecting, and/or operating stage lighting units, such as stage lights. Sometimes, they are necessary to have during scene changes, in the case of moving set pieces with lighting equipment inside. Typically, more than one will be backstage.
- Master Electrician: responsible for the maintenance and operation of dimming & power distribution systems during a performance, including "hot" or "live" patching. Occasionally, some of these duties could also be delegated to the run crew's deck electricians.
- Spotlight Operator (or follow spot operator/dome operator): operates a type of lighting instrument called a follow spot, which allows a performer to be lit evenly no matter where on stage they may go. It can typically be found in the lighting booth, along with the light board op. Also, some theaters have followed spots located above a false ceiling, on the catwalk.

=== Sound ===
- Sound operator (A1): operates the sound board and/or audio control system specified by the sound designer, computerized or otherwise. Sometimes this is integrated with the show control system. There can be multiple soundboard ops. Alternative names/technical labels for the position include: A1.
- Mic wrangler (A2): manages microphones and maintains headsets as a show runs. Usually, there are several mic wranglers located backstage, in the wings, with the running crew. Alternative names/technical labels for the position include: A2, A3, Audio Technician.

=== Stage ===
- Flymen (or fly crew/rail crew): operate the fly system, a system of ropes or wires, pulleys, and counterweights by means of which scenery is "flown" in and out (down and up, respectively) during scene changes.
- Stagehand: A technician responsible for moving scenery at the stage level, by manually carrying or rolling set pieces (e.g., scenery wagons) between the stage and the wings. This can include carrying on and off furniture, props, or scenery.

=== Costumes ===
- Wardrobe: In charge of facilitating the use of costumes during shows. Often referred to as running wardrobe, wardrobe manager, and wardrobe assistants. They have assistants, dressers, who help with fittings and quick changes (when an actor needs to change costume very quickly, often backstage).
- Makeup: responsible for applying or assisting in the application of face and body paints, wigs and hairpieces, etc.
- Dresser: A member of the running crew present in the wings of the stage. Their main responsibilities including, helping the actors get dressed during pre-show, choreographing quick changes, executing quick changes from hidden spaces on-stage, and making emergency repairs throughout the duration of the show.
