= Call boy =

Call boy may refer to:

- Call boy (theatre), a stagehand who alerts actors and actresses of their entrances during a performance
- Male prostitute or callboy, a man who sells his body to people
- Call Boy (horse), a Thoroughbred horse, winner of The Derby in 1927
- Call Boy, a standardbred harness-racing horse, winner of the Great Northern Derby in 1958
