= Production company =

Company or studio that produces media

A production company, production house, or production studio is a studio that creates works in the fields of performing arts, new media art, film, television, radio, comics, interactive arts, video games, websites, music, and video. These groups consist of technical staff and members to produce the media, and are often incorporated as a commercial publisher.

Generally the term refers to all individuals responsible for the technical aspects of creating a particular product, regardless of where in the process their expertise is required, or how long they are involved in the project. For example, in a theatrical performance, the production team has not only the running crew, but also the theatrical producer, designers, and theatrical direction.

== Tasks and functions ==
The production company may be directly responsible for fundraising the production or may accomplish this through a parent company, partner, or private investor. It handles budgeting, scheduling, scripting, the supply with talent and resources, the organization of staff, the production itself, post-production, distribution, and marketing.

Production companies are often either owned or under contract with a media conglomerate, film studio, record label, video game publisher, or entertainment company, due to the concentration of media ownership, who act as the production company's partner or parent company. This has become known as the "studio system". Independent studios usually prefer production house (see Lionsgate), production studio (see Amazon Studios), or production team (see Rooster Teeth). In the case of television, a production company would serve under a television network. Production companies can work together in co-productions. In music, the term production team typically refers to a group of individuals filling the role of "record producer" usually reserved for one individual. Some examples of musical production teams include Matmos and D-Influence.

The aforementioned publishing conglomerates distribute said creative works, but it is not uncommon for production companies to act as a publication. For example, The Walt Disney Company and Nintendo act as publisher for Walt Disney Animation Studios and Nintendo Entertainment Planning & Development respectively. Self-publishing, in this case, should not be confused with a self-publishing vanity press which are paid services. Both large and small production studios have an editorial board or editor-in-chief, along with other forms of a command hierarchy.

== Type ==
Entertainment companies operate as mini conglomerate, operating many divisions or subsidiaries in many different industries. Warner Bros. Entertainment and Lionsgate Entertainment are two companies with this corporate structure. It allows for a single company to maintain control over seemingly unrelated companies that fall within the ranges of entertainment, which increases and centralises the revenue into one company (example: a film production company, TV production company, video game company, and comic book company are all owned by a single entertainment company). A motion picture company, such as Paramount Pictures, specializing "only" in motion pictures is only connected with its other counterpart industries through its parent company. Instead of performing a corporate reorganization, many motion picture companies often have sister companies they collaborate with in other industries that are subsidiaries owned by their parent company and is often not involved in the making of products that are not motion picture related. A film production company can either operate as an affiliate (under a contract) or as a subsidiary for an entertainment company, motion picture company, television network, or all, and are generally smaller than the company they are partnered with.

=== Book to film unit ===
A book to film unit is a unit of a book publishing company for the purposes of getting books that they published adapted into film.

==== Background ====
Films have been using books as a prime source for films for years. In 2012, six out of the nine best picture Oscar nominees were originally books. Previously, publishers did not develop their books into movie nor receive any of the profits. Neither Scholastic or Little Brown, get any box office revenue from the Harry Potter and The Twilight Saga movies just through book sales. As the publishers faced decreasing revenue due to increased competition from self-published e-books, or Amazon.com moving into the publishing field, publishers have started to enter the film and TV production business to boost their net income with Amazon attempting to compete there too. More screenwriters are turning to book publishers to get their screenplay published as a book, so as to have a boost in their attempt to have the screenplay turned into a movie, given that it is a known product after the book.

==== History ====
Publisher Simon & Schuster, though not involved with film and TV, shares possible film and TV deals with CBS (S&S is owned by Paramount Global). Alloy Entertainment while not a unit of a publisher started using a book packaging to film model of film and TV development by developing the property in-house, hire authors for the books and films, so as to own the property. Random House was the first big six book publisher to establish a book to film unit, Random House Films, in 2005 with a Focus Features deal under a development and co-finance plan.

Macmillan Films was launched by Thomas Dunne Books in October 2010 under the packaging model similar to Alloy while also moving to get film rights from Dunne's published author. Also that year, Random House changed their strategy to film development and packaging only.

Condé Nast Entertainment was started by Magazine publisher Conde Nast in October 2012. In 2013, Macmillan Films became Macmillan Entertainment with an expansion to look at other divisions' book for possible films.

== Operation and profit ==
A production company is usually run by a producer or director, but can also be run by a career executive. In entertainment, a production company relies highly on talent or a well known entertainment franchise to raise the value of an entertainment project and draw out larger audiences. This gives the entertainment industry a democratized power structure to ensure that both the companies and talent receive their fair share of pay and recognition for work done on a production.

The entertainment industry is centered on funding (investments from studios, investment firms, or individuals either from earnings from previous productions or personal wealth), projects (scripts and entertainment franchises), and talent (actors, directors, screenwriters, and crew). Production companies are judged and ranked based on the amount of funding it has, as well the productions it has completed or been involved with in the past. If a production company has major funding either through earnings, studio investors, or private investors, and has done or been involved with big budget productions in the past, it is considered to be a major production company. These companies often work with well-known and expensive talent. If a production company does not have much funding and has not done or been involved with any big budget productions, it is considered to be a small production company. These companies often work with up and coming talent.

Small production companies will either grow to become a major production company, a subsidiary completely owned by another company, remain small, or fail. The success of an entertainment production company is centered on the projects it produces, the talent it can acquire, and the performance of the talent. Marketing is also a major factor. All films, as a tradition, are often marketed around the image and the performance of the actors; with an option of marketing the behind the scenes crew such as the directors and screenwriters. Unlike many other businesses, a production company does not rely on an ongoing revenue stream, they operate on ongoing investments; this often requires a parent company or a private corporate investment entity (see Legendary Pictures). Their only source of profit comes from the productions they produce. Because entertainment and media are currently in "high demand", a production company can profit if its management is capable of using its resources to supply good quality products and services to the public. Many entertainment production companies brand their entertainment projects. An entertainment project can either become a "one time hit" or an ongoing "entertainment franchise" that can be continued, remade, rebooted, or expanded into other sister industries; such as the video game industry (see Star Wars, Star Trek). Entertainment projects can be either an original or an adaptation from another industry.

In rare occasional cases, a few troubled major studios would also shed their distribution and/or marketing staffs, mainly due to reduced resources, and resort to co-investing and/or co-distributing film projects with larger studios, operating as virtual, production-only movie studios. Notable examples include legendary studio Metro-Goldwyn-Mayer, which, after many years of box office flops (mostly with low budgets), bad management and distribution, and bankruptcy, was restructured at the end of 2010 under new management and currently struck deals with some of the Big Six studios (most notably the Sony Pictures Motion Picture Group and Warner Bros.); Miramax, which was downsized by former owner Disney into a smaller division.

== Staffing, funds, and equipment ==
Because a production company is only operational when a production is being produced and most of the talent and crew are freelancers, many production companies are only required to hire management staff that helps to oversee the company's daily activities. In some cases, a production company can be run by only a handful of people. The company's funds are mainly committed towards employing talent, crew, and acquiring new updated production equipment on a regular basis. Many productions often require at least one to two cameras and lighting equipment for on location shooting. Production equipment is either leased or purchased from another production company or directly from the manufacturer. In the entertainment industry, in order to secure experienced professional talent and crew, production companies often become a signatory company to that talent or crew members "guild". By becoming a signatory company, it agrees to abide by the guild regulations. All big budget guild productions are exclusive to guild members and non guild members are not allowed to participate in these productions unless authorized by the guild. Productions with smaller budgets are allowed to use both guild talent and talent from the public. The majority of the talent and crew working in the entertainment industry are members of their professions guild. Most productions in the entertainment industry are guild productions.

== Production ==
A production company is responsible for the development and filming of a specific production or media broadcast. In entertainment, the production process begins with the development of a specific project. Once a final script has been produced by the screenwriters, the production enters into the pre-production phase, most productions never reach this phase for financing or talent reasons. In pre-production, the actors are signed on and prepared for their roles, crew is signed on, shooting locations are found, sets are built or acquired, and the proper shooting permits are acquired for on location shooting. Actors and crew are hand picked by the producer, director, and casting director, who often use collaborators or referenced personnel to prevent untrusted or unwelcomed people from gaining access to a specific production and compromising the entire production through leaks. Once a production enters into principal photography, it begins filming. Productions are almost never cancelled once they reach this phase. Codenames are often used on bigger productions during filming to conceal the production's shooting locations for both privacy and safety reasons. In many cases, the director, producers, and the leading actors are often the only people with access to a full or majority of a single script. Supporting actors, background actors, and crew often never receive a full copy of a specific script to prevent leaks. Productions are often shot in secured studios, with limited to no public access, but they are also shot on location on secured sets or locations. Due to the exposure, when shooting in public locations, major productions often employ security to ensure the protection of the talent and crew working on a specific production. After filming is completed, the production enters into post production, which is handled by a post production company and overseen by the production company. The editing, musical score, visual effects, re-recording of the dialog, and sound effects are "mixed" to create the final film, which is then screened at the final screening. Marketing is also launched during this phase, such as the release of trailers and posters. Once a final film has been approved, the film is taken over by the distributors, who then release the film.

== Other details ==
For legal reasons, it is common within the entertainment industry for production companies not to accept unsolicited materials from any other company, talent, or the general public. It is also common for filmmakers or producers to become entrepreneurs and open their own production companies so that they can have more control over their careers and pay, while acting as an "in-house" creative and business driving force for their company but continuing to freelance as an artist for other companies, if desired.

== Deals ==
- Overall deal where a distributor has the rights to all the output of a production company. The creator is paid in an overall deal regardless if projects are taken to production or not, and all projects developed are owned by the distributor.
- First-look deal where a network has the right of refusal to all the output of a production company, after which the production company is free to shop the project to other distributors.

== See also ==
- Directors Guild
- Executive producer
- Film crew; Production team; Television crew
- Film distributor; Broadcast syndication
- Filmmaking; Video production
- Hip hop production
- Impresario
- International Cinematographers Guild
- List of film production companies
- List of television production companies
- Outline of film
- Film studio; Television studio
- Screen Actors Guild
- Stagecraft; Theatrical producer; Television producer; Film producer
