= American Shakespeare Theatre =

Former theatre company in Connecticut, U.S.

Coordinates: 41.1851°N 73.1253°W

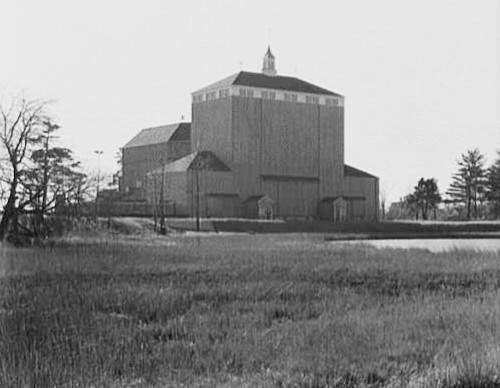
The theatre exterior in 1955

The American Shakespeare Theatre was a theater company based in Stratford, Connecticut, United States.

It was formed in the early 1950s by Lawrence Langner, Lincoln Kirstein, John Percy Burrell, and philanthropist Joseph Verner Reed. The American Shakespeare Festival Theatre was constructed and the program opened on July 12, 1955, with Julius Caesar. The theater building burned to the ground on January 13, 2019.

== History ==
Plays were produced at the Festival Theatre in Stratford from 1955 until the company ceased operations in the mid-1980s. The company focused on American interpretations of William Shakespeare's plays, but occasionally produced plays by other playwrights, including T.S. Eliot, Bernard Shaw, Sophocles, Giuseppe Verdi, Thornton Wilder, Tennessee Williams, and William Wycherley.

The first artistic director was Denis Carey, who had managed The Old Vic in London. Under Carey's direction, the productions were not impressive financially or artistically. John Houseman took over as artistic director in 1956, and his associate director was Jack Landau. Houseman resigned his position in August 1959 and Landau was promoted one month later.

In 1992, the Hartford Courant posted a history of productions at the theater, which was the home of the American Shakespeare Festival.

The last full season of the festival was 1982, when the theater filed for Chapter 11 bankruptcy protection. The last production on the theater stage was a one-person show of The Tempest in September 1989. Previous efforts had included plans to raise money to renovate the structure, as well as alternate plans to demolish it and construct an amphitheater in its place.

== Notable actors ==
Notable actors involved with the American Shakespeare Theatre included:

- René Auberjonois
- Meredith Baxter
- Brian Bedford
- Dirk Benedict
- David Birney
- Len Cariou
- Morris Carnovsky
- Alex Cord
- Ruby Dee
- Patricia Elliott
- Geraldine Fitzgerald
- Jonathan Frid
- Will Geer
- David Groh
- Fred Gwynne
- Margaret Hamilton
- Katharine Hepburn
- John Houseman
- Earle Hyman
- James Earl Jones
- Joe Mantell
- Hal Miller
- Jan Miner
- Michael Moriarty
- Kate Mulgrew
- Christopher Plummer
- Mary Ellen Ray
- Lynn Redgrave
- Kate Reid
- Pernell Roberts
- Robert Ryan
- Charles Siebert
- Maria Tucci
- Christopher Walken
- Fritz Weaver

== Crest ==
One of seven crests donated by the Timex Corporation was stolen in March 2012. Each of the crests represented a different Shakespearean play. Timex had a long affiliation with the theater, starting with a donation of "the world's only properly calibrated sundial" in 1956.

== ShakesBeer Festival ==
In 2013, beer manager Steven Bilodeau of Wines Unlimited and Pete Rodrigues of Captain's Keg organized a beer festival on the grounds of the American Shakespeare Theatre called the ShakesBeer Festival in order to raise funds towards the restoration and reopening of the theater. The ShakesBeer Festival was held on August 23, 2014, and raised over $30,000 and donated $20,000 to the restoration efforts after final expenses. This event was designed to be an annual event in order to bring in a source of revenue to the theater and to raise awareness.

== Festival! Stratford ==
The 9th Festival! Stratford presented A Midsummer Night's Dream, performed by the Connecticut Free Shakespeare, on the grounds July 31 through August 1, 2013.

== Fire ==
The theater burned to the ground on Sunday, January 13, 2019. The structure was unoccupied at the time and had been vacant for ten years. No fatalities or injuries occurred, and nothing was recovered from the building.

The cause of the fire remained unknown for several months. In April 2019, local teenagers, Logan Caraballo, Vincent Keller, and Christopher Sakowicz, were charged as adults with arson, burglary, and other felonies in connection with the fire. They were charged with starting five additional fires in the months following the theater fire.

The trio originally pled not guilty in court, but they publicly confessed on Snapchat after the theater arson. Sakowicz and Keller later changed their pleas to guilty, with Sakowicz being found primarily responsible and receiving a ten-year prison sentence as well as fifteen years special parole and mandatory psychiatric treatment. Keller potentially faced up to eighteen months in prison, while Caraballo's case remained pending and sealed as of December 2022.

The Shakespeare Academy at Stratford said that it planned to continue to stage outdoor performances at the property during the summer of 2019.

== Redevelopment ==
In 2022, the town of Stratford was awarded three million dollars from the State Bond Commission to redevelop the site. Proposals were rejected for a large-scale replica of an Elizabethan theater in favor of more-modest designs featuring a multi-disciplinary arts space and an outdoor amphitheater, collectively known as the Stratford Performing Arts Center.

== See also ==
- Hamlet's Dresser, a 2002 memoir by Bob Smith about the author's experiences at the American Shakespeare Theatre
- Lists of theatres

== Sources ==
- Cooper, Roberta Krensky (1986). The American Shakespeare Theatre: Stratford, 1955–1985. Associated University Presses. ISBN 978-0918016881.
- Engle, Ron; Londré, Felicia Hardison; Watermeyer, Daniel J., eds. (1995). Shakespeare Companies and Festivals: An International Guide. Westport: Greenwood Press. pp. 100–107. ISBN 978-0313274343.
