= Carpenter (theatre) =

Type of stagehand

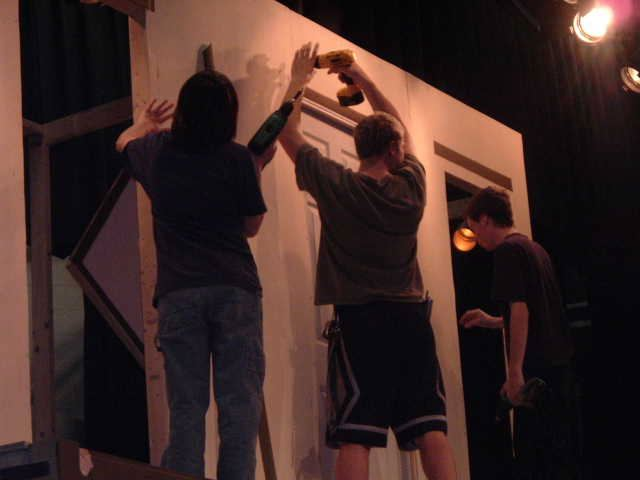
Theatre carpenters work to construct sets for theatrical productions.

In theatre, a carpenter is a stagehand who builds sets and stage elements. They usually are hired by the production manager, crew chief or technical director. In some less common cases, they may be hired by the director, or producer. They are usually paid by the hour.

Carpenters receive drafting from the technical director who uses the designers' renderings, models, and/or drafting of the set to create the technical drawings for the production. Working mainly with woods and metals, they use techniques that include woodworking and welding. They build set pieces, including some standard elements—flats, platforms and columns—as well as pieces of the stage. For example, a carpenter may be responsible for building stairs and ramps on and off of the performance area and for leveling the stage floor itself.

Only carpenters trained as riggers are trusted to do rigging (see fly crew). Often union houses and some larger theatres make distinctions between carpenters and riggers, but most smaller theatres do not, due to staffing limitations.

Professional carpenters do not work on anything with an electrical component (see electrician). They also do not paint the set, as this is the job of a scenic artist.

Often, stage carpentry for a large production is organized with one "master carpenter" or "shop foreman" and many subordinate carpenters.

== See also ==
- Stagecraft
- Carpenter
