= Scene shop =

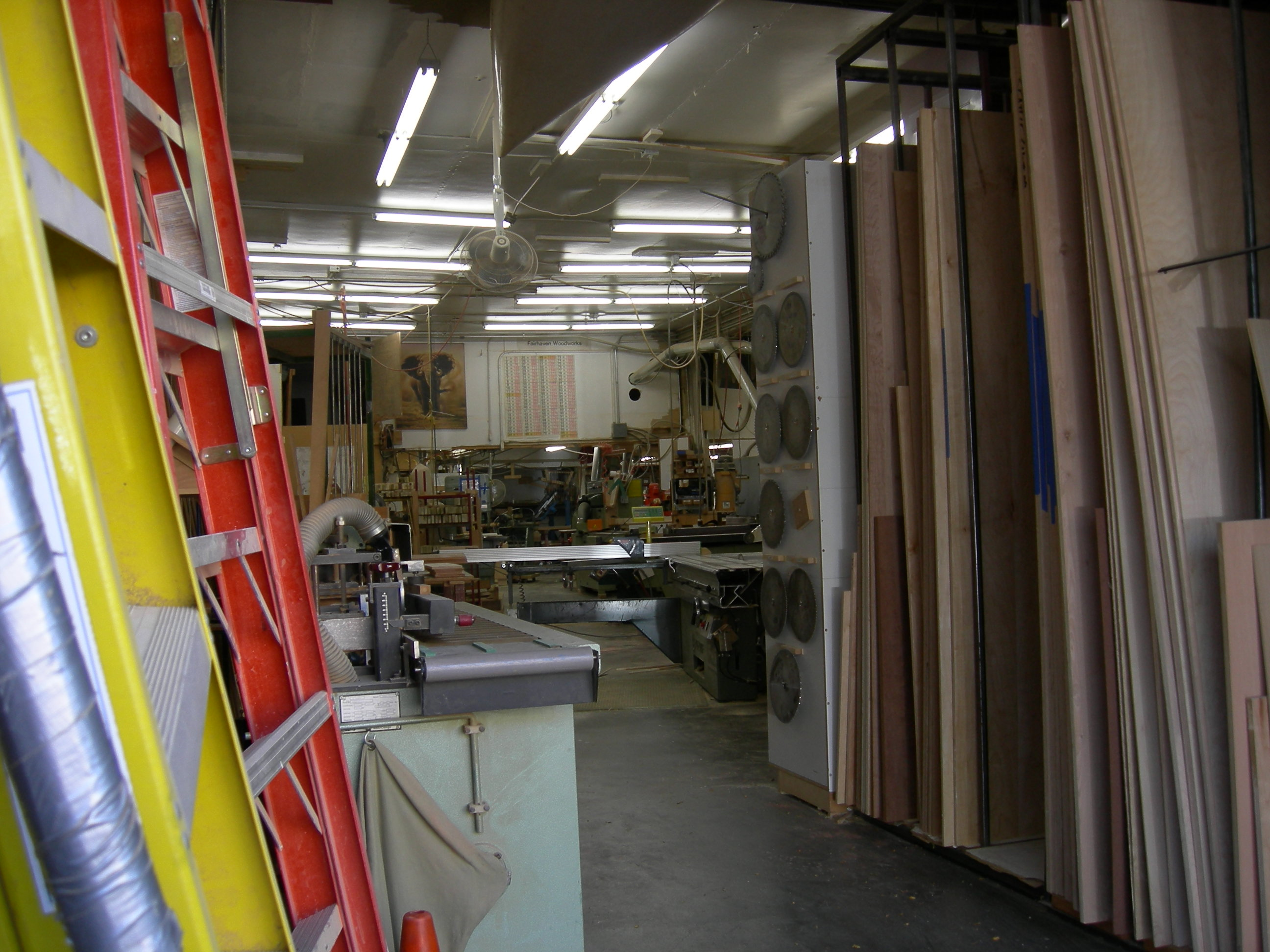
Scenery shop.

A scenery shop or scene shop is a specialized workshop found in many medium or large theaters, as well as many educational theatre settings. The primary function of a scene shop is to fabricate and assemble the flats, platforms, scenery wagons, and other scenic (set) pieces required for a performance. Commonly, a scene shop is also the location where most of the set painting is done, and is sometimes used to make props. Generally, the individuals who work in a scene shop are carpenters, although, in bigger shops, it is common for metalworkers to be employed for steel-construction set pieces which require welding and other machining. It is common for the individuals working in a scene shop to be knowledgeable in a wide variety of technical skills, developed over time as required for specific construction needs. Over time, scene shops have evolved over the influence and ideas by designs such as: Adolphe Appia, Edward Gordon Craig, Robert Edmond Jones who have been part/contributors to the New Stagecraft Movement. Scene shops allow designers to create, try and explore different ideas by creating drafts/prototypes with cheaper materials before completing the set design with concrete materials that will be utilized, all within the scene shop.

== Commercial shops ==
Commercial scene shops can also be found in larger metropolitan areas, where they are capable of supplying scenic elements to a variety of clients, including theatre, film, television, and corporate productions. Scenic studios also sometimes make elements for museum booths, touring concerts, and other custom fabrication tasks.

== Shop construction ==
Although many scene shops are located in general purpose building, most are in purpose built spaces because scenic fabrication has some fairly specific needs. Often they are in very large, open rooms, to accommodate big elements that a show may call for. They are usually attached directly to a loading dock for delivery of materials and shipping of finished elements. If they are attached to a performance venue, it is also common to have large doors providing access to the stage. Typically, compressed air and dust collection systems are distributed around the shop. Many processes in a scene shop such as spray painting, welding, or hot-wire foam cutting produce dangerous gasses, so often extra ventilation is installed. Ideally, fume collection systems are available to use near the actual workpiece. Power is usually available in floor pockets or dropped from the ceiling, in a variety of voltages, as some tools, especially welders require high voltages. Often, scene shops have designated areas inside for paints, carpentry, metalwork, and sometimes prop construction. A scene shop will have many worker who are skilled to different craft work.

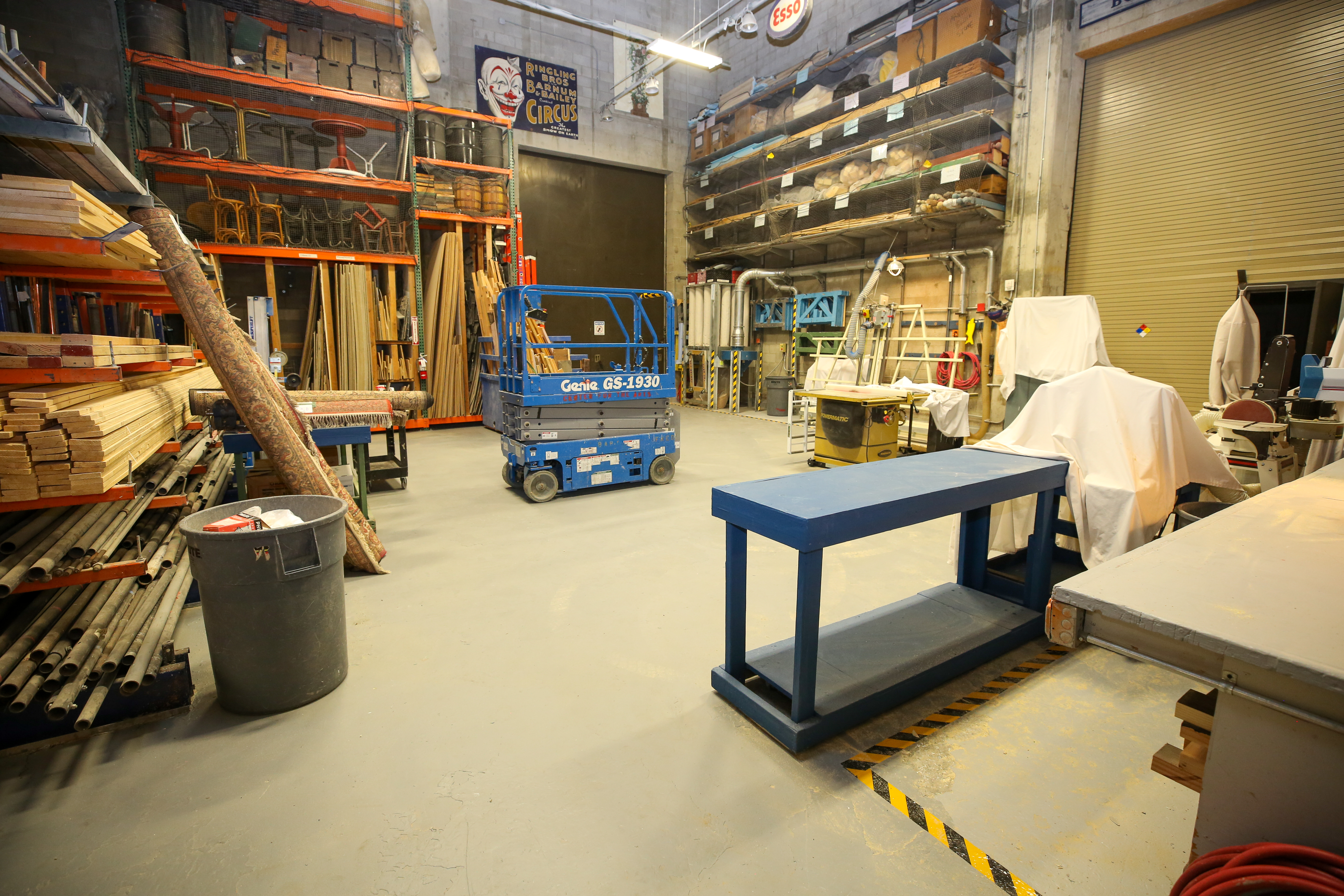
Scene Shop Image

Safety plays an important role and has been in major consideration over time, as the flat, platforms, and other scenic views have become more complex and dynamic. These shops have been organized in specific zones/places to create a safe environment for their members. This includes added ventilation systems in the scene shops to collect particulate dust or even painting booths to collect hazardous gases. Other safety measures taken, as required by the Personal Protective Equipment, consist of gloves, masks, goggles, and fume/dust extraction systems. Maintenance also plays a role in scene shops, ensuring that the tools used to operate the construction are safe to use, and if unkept, then a replacement will be needed.

Common tools used can be hazardous to those inexperienced, and other common material safety concerns, as modern technology has been implemented consists of:

- Polyurethane Foams
- Polyester resins
- Methacrylate Monomers
- Industrial Solvents

== Roles in a scene shop ==
Members/Personnel in a Scene Shop Include:

- Technical Director: Has a general overview of the process, ensures safety is reinforced, and ensures the design/construction is within budget.
- Props Artisan: Responsible for creating/detailing smaller props.
- Scenic Artists: Handles the overall illusion of the background/props being used and created, by handling the color and texture.
- Carpenters/Metalworkers: Responsible for building the main structures for backgrounds and platforms.

== Modern processes in scene shops ==
- Automation: Integration of programmable systems and operations
- CNC machines: Assist in accurate cutting and shaping for more complicated designs.
- CAD and Digital Concepts are created before starting the scene shop process.
- Laser Cutters: Provide accurate and precise cuts to specific materials such as wood.
- 3D Printing: Provides more detailed props

== Common scenery shop tools ==
- Circular saws
- Table saw
- Power drills
- Screwdrivers
- Hammers
- Miter saws
- Welder
- Cutoff grinder
- Power sander
- Showers
- Hot-Wire Foam Cutters
- Jigsaw and Band Saws

== Common materials used ==
- Wood: Plywood & Lumber
- Metal: Steel & Aluminum
- Fabric: Muslin & Velour for Masking
- Plastic and Foam: Sculpting and light elements
- Hardware: Bolts, Hinges & Fasteners.
