= Cue (theatrical) =

Trigger for an action to be carried out in a certain time

A theatrical cue is the trigger for an action to be carried out at a specific time. It is generally associated with theatre and the film industry. They can be necessary for a lighting change or effect, a sound effect, or some sort of stage or set movement/change.

== Types ==
Cues are generally given by the stage manager as a verbal signal over the headset system or backstage intercom, by a signal with a 'cue light' or by a show control system. There are 3 types of cues given. Warning, Standby, and Go.

- Warning: Given about a minute prior to the cue and gives time for crew members to get ready and make sure everything is set (this is especially important with cues for set or rail changes).
- Standby: Given a few seconds before the cue and tells the crew members everything should be set and they should be standing by to go.
- Go: Given at the moment the cue should be executed. This sets the crew members in action.

== Calling and execution ==
There are several common methods for the stage manager to call warning, standby and go and each stage manager has their own method. The important thing is that they can be heard and understood. Here is an example of a way a stage manager might call for Light Cue #24

- "Warning LX 24"
- "Standby LX 24"
- "LX 24 GO"

The words 'warning' and 'standby' both come before the department and cue number, but the word 'go' comes after. This is because as soon as the word 'go' is heard the crew will execute the cue. It is important that no crew member use the word 'go' in any way while speaking into the intercom system, including casual use of the word 'go' by the stage manager. When discussing cues, many stage managers and crew members will substitute the phrase "the G word" or "G-O" (/dʒiː oʊ/) for the word 'go'.

If there are multiple cues right in a row, rather than calling warnings, standbys and go's, a stage manager might say: "Warning Lights 26 through 30, Standby Lights 26 through 30, Lights 26 Go, Lights 27 Go, Lights 28 Go, Lights 29 Go, Lights 30 Go."

The technician(s) or sound and board ops who are to take the cue are expected to respond so that the stage manager knows they have heard and understood them. A typical response could be, "Standing by", "Thank you, Sound", "Standby Rail," or simply "Lights."

Many types of cues are not apparent to the stage manager, or are subtle. In this case the technician who executed the cue usually responds with a taken note; e.g. "Rail cue 11 taken."

The stage manager may ask for the operator to say when the cue is completed. For this, it will be said:

- SM: Standby Pyro 2, with a complete.
- Pyro: Standing by.
- SM: Pyro 2, GO.
- [pyro happens]
- Pyro: Completed.

Sometime either the warning or the standby is omitted. This is common if, for example a number of cues are close to each other and don't require preparation. Sometimes, in amateur or British theaters, a single warning or standby cue is consistently given about 30 seconds before the 'Go.'

== Order ==
Cues have established numbers, generally starting from 1 and progressing in integers. If an extra cue is added after the initial list is set, it may be divided by a decimal or a letter. for example, a sequence may go 37, 37.3, 37.7 or 51A, 51B, 51C. It is rare for two decimal digits to be used (like 12.45, 12.46,) particularly as some lighting boards only allow one decimal digit. Show control systems, however, allow and frequently use multiple decimal places as well as digits especially since MIDI Show Control allows an almost unlimited number. An example is 12.46.128.39.

In some systems, lighting, sound, and rail, etc. cues each have their own sequence. In this case, a stage manager would call, for example, Lights 1, Sound 1, Lights 2, Rail 1, Lights 3, etc. In other systems, the cues are arranged together, so that what the stage manager calls is sequential. In this system they might call Lights 1, Sound 2, Lights 3. It is acceptable in this system for there to be gaps in one discipline's cue stack. In this system, it is sometimes also acceptable for a single cue to control two or more separate actions. For example, a stage manager may call "Lights and sound 45" if the two are supposed to go simultaneously. Many show control systems are also easily capable of this sort of simultaneous cueing ability.

== Followspot cues ==
Often followspot operators do not take their cues from stage managers. This is generally because the timing of actors' entrances and exits and other movements may vary from night to night, and because calling every followspot cue could become too complicated and interfere with the calling and execution of other cues. However, if there is a problem with the actor appearing on stage, the stage manager will notify the followspots of this over headset. More commonly, a stage manager may only call very specific followspot cues, like a blackout—frequently on a blackout cue there is a light cue, a sound cue, a followspot cue and sometimes even a set cue, so it is very important that everything happens all at the same time. Aside from this, followspot operators take their own cues and follow their own cue sheet, or take direction from the lighting board operator on a communications subsystem dedicated to lighting cues.

(If a stage manager were to call every cue for a follow spot operator, it might sound something like this: "Spot 1, pick up <actor name>, spot 2 iris down, spot 1 switch to color frame #4, spot 3 douse out, spot 4 pick up <actor name>, spot 2 switch to color frame #2.")

== Cue lights ==
Cue lights are sometimes used for backstage cues when a headset for communications is impractical, such as when an actor needs to make an entrance, or if there is a cue needed on stage when the crew needs to be silent. The cue light is a system of one or more light bulbs, controlled by the stage managers using a switch the same way that they would call audio cues over the headset. The cue lights usually use traffic light colours: a solid red light indicates a 'warning' cue; an optional yellow light or a flashing red light indicates "standby"; a green light signals "go." No light at all can represent that no cue is pending. Depending upon the protocol used, a solid red light may indicate that the standby has been acknowledged, or that no cue is pending. An alternate scheme with only one lamp uses "on" as a standby cue and "off" as the cue. Some cue light systems allow the actors or crew to acknowledge back to the Cue Light Operator that the cue has been received.

Many sound operators prefer cue lights to headsets so that they can hear the house sound accurately. Alternately, they will use a headset with a call light, rather than continually wearing it.

== Cue sheet ==
A cue sheet is a form usually generated by the deputy stage manager or design department head that indicates information about the cue including execution, timing, sequence, intensity (for lights), and volume (for sound). The board operators, running and deck crews may have copies of the cue sheet with just the information dealing with their department. The stage manager keeps a master list of all the cues in the show and keeps track of them in the prompt book.

== See also ==
- Stage management
- Light board operator
- Followspot operator
- Running crew
- Show control
- MIDI Show Control
- Click track
- Cue card
