= Wardrobe supervisor =

Mass media occupation

The wardrobe supervisor is responsible for overseeing all wardrobe related activities during the course of a theatrical run or film shoot. The modern title "wardrobe supervisor" has evolved from the more traditional titles of "wardrobe mistress/master" or "mistress/master of the wardrobe". The wardrobe supervisor may be present at some production meetings and fittings, their primary responsibilities generally begin at the load-in stage of a production and during prep of a film. At load-in physical custody and responsibility for the costumes shifts from the costume designer and shop staff to the wardrobe supervisor.

The wardrobe supervisor supervises all dressers and costumers working on a production. In consultation with the production manager, stage manager, costume designer, and sometimes the director, the wardrobe supervisor helps to coordinate and assign dressers to specific performers and tasks. They help determine where and how costume changes are made. Generally, the wardrobe supervisor decides whether a point in a production requires a quick change backstage, or if there is time for a normal change in the dressing room. All dressers report directly to the wardrobe supervisor, who acts as primary liaison between dressers, the costumer, and stage management.

== Duties ==
The wardrobe supervisor's primary responsibilities include:

- The care and proper maintenance of all costumes, shoes, undergarments, hats and costume related personal props such as gloves, jewelry, parasols, fans and pocket books.
- To ensure the proper labeling, hanging, storage and preset of all costume pieces.
- To create and execute a proper cleaning schedule for all garments, ensuring that laundry and dry cleaning are done on a regular basis between performances. They also coordinate the regular changing of dress shields, the application of garment freshening sprays and providing clean undergarments to the performers.
- To ensure that all costumes are properly pressed or steamed prior to each performance.
- The wardrobe supervisor also regularly inventories and inspects all costumes and coordinates all costume repairs. The majority of minor costume repairs are done on site at the theatre by either the Wardrobe Supervisor or in the cases of many regional theatres, the onsite wardrobe maintenance crew which is connected to the in house costume shop. Most repairs are considered "emergencies", however, and whenever possible they are done onsite at the theatre before and sometimes during the actual performance. The wardrobe supervisor's space in the theatre, with few exceptions, contains a sewing machine, glue gun, and all sewing supplies necessary for any type of emergency repair that could be required. Most wardrobe supervisors are very qualified seamstresses in their own right. The rule of thumb is that only in the case of very significant damage is a costume sent back to the shop for repair. The one exception to this rule are shoes. Although most supervisor's maintain a regular schedule for polishing and re-spraying of shoes, for safety reasons, actual shoe repair work is always sent out.
- At the end of a production run, the wardrobe supervisor oversees all aspects of the costume strike. In the case of rented costumes, they coordinate restoring costumes to original condition. This includes ripping out hems or alterations that may have been done for fitting, and removing any added trim or ornamentation. Sometimes this work is extensive enough that the costumes are returned to either the designer's or theatre's shop for laundering and restoration. Regardless, the wardrobe supervisor is responsible for providing a complete and accurate inventory that ensures all pieces are returned.

A good wardrobe supervisor ensures that costumes look as fresh and new for the last performance as they did on opening night.
