= Hamlet's Dresser =

2002 memoir by Bob Smith

- Author: Bob Smith
- Language: English
- Subject: Theatre
- Genre: Memoir
- Publisher: Scribner
- Publication date: 2002
- Publication place: United States
- Media type: Hardcover, paperback
- Pages: 288
- ISBN: 9780684852706

Hamlet's Dresser is a memoir by Bob Smith. It was first published in 2002.

The title derives from the author's work as a dresser for a production of Hamlet at the American Shakespeare Theatre in Stratford, Connecticut.

== Author ==
Bob Smith
- Born: Robert W. Smith; July 10, 1941 (age 85)

Robert W. Smith was born on July 10, 1941.

== Reception ==
Hamlet's Dresser was a Wall Street Journal editor's pick, a Barnes & Noble top choice, and a Book of the Month Club selection.

== See also ==
- 2002 in literature
- Shakespeare in performance
