= Stagehand =

Person who works backstage at a performance

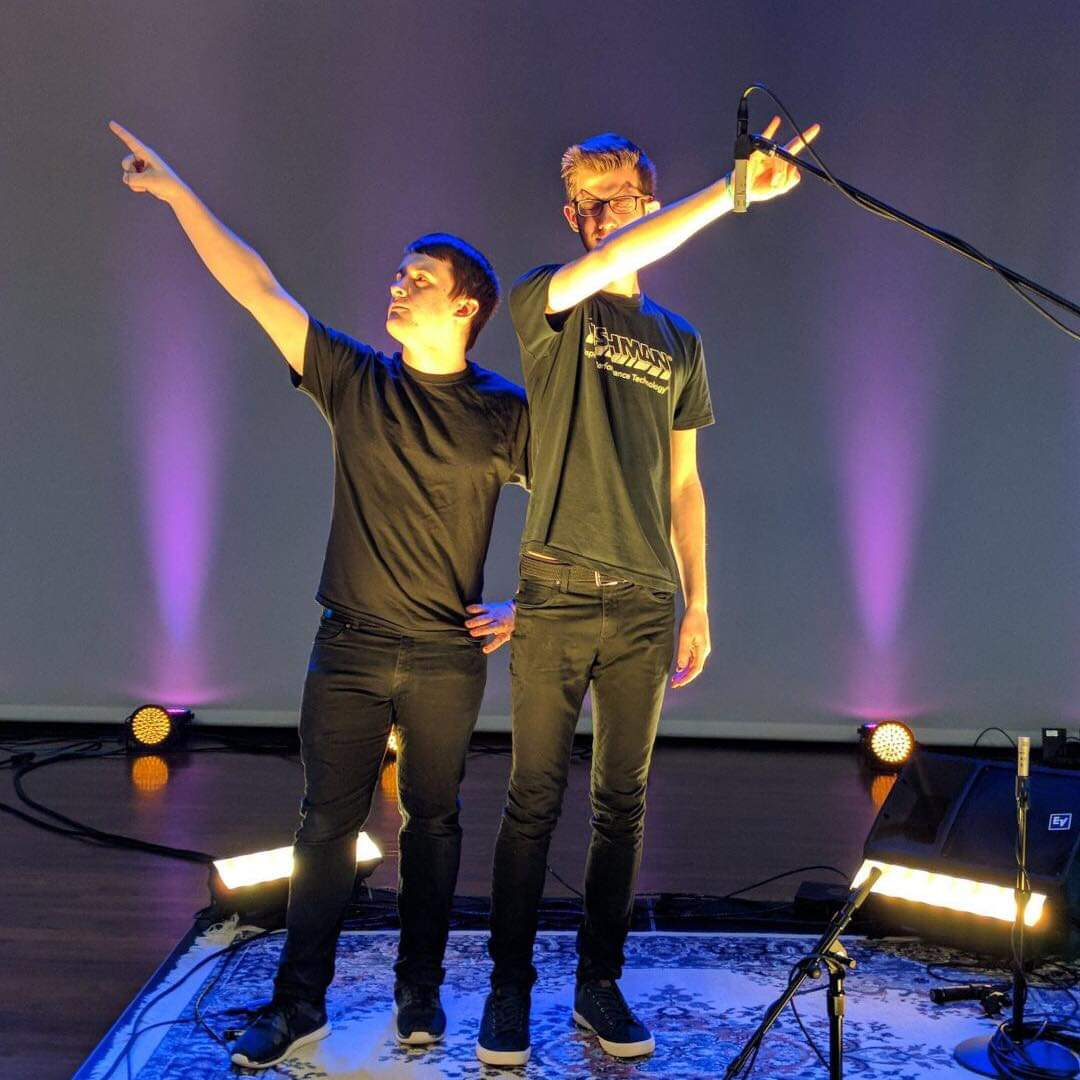
Stagehands after setting up equipment for a concert

A stagehand is a person who works backstage or behind the scenes in theatres, film, television, or location performance. Their work includes setting up the scenery, lights, sound, props, rigging, and special effects for a production.

== General ==
Stagehands are usually skilled in multiple disciplines, including rigging, carpentry, painting, stage electrics, stage lighting, audio, video/projection, and props. Stagehands are often responsible for operating the systems during shows or taping and also for the repair and maintenance of the equipment. Most stagehands have a general knowledge of all the phases of a production, but tend to develop specialties and focus on specific areas.

Riggers are in charge of the things that hang. This may include building structures that are tens of stories high. They use safety gear similar to that used for mountain climbing.

Carpenters construct and set up scenery. They may also move scenery on stage during a show.

Electricians, or more commonly known as "Lighting technicians", set up all the lights, program the light design in the lighting console and run the follow spot (what people often call a spotlight). Audio and Video departments fall under the Electricians label.

Stagehands are generally employed on a show-by-show basis, although most major theaters and studios maintain staff heads of departments and assistants. Often, they are union members, typically part of the I.A.T.S.E. in North America or ABTT in the UK.

== Challenges ==
Stagehands may work in many venues, including both large and small traditional theatrical spaces, convention centers, outdoor venues, concert arenas, film sets, television studios and others. Skilled stagehands know how to work in a wide range of theaters and other venues to support successful shows.

Different disciplines experience different risks. The most serious injury risk for riggers is falling. The primary risks for carpenters are things falling on them or being injured by power tools. Electrocution is the most serious risk for stagehands working with lighting or power.

When a show travels or goes on tour, some stagehands travel with the show (sometimes known as the road crew for a show) and others work to support the shows at each new venue (sometimes known as the local crew). Usually everything the show needs is transported from venue to venue in trucks. Local stagehands load-in a tour under the direction of the road crew, also known as roadies.

After the show, which can be one day or as long as a month, they take it all apart and load back onto the fleet of trucks to haul it to the next city.

When a show is produced locally, stagehands build and set up the scenery, hang all the lights, and set up sound systems. Stagehands work closely with the directors, lighting designers, set designers, costume designers, and sound designers to ensure their visions are realized.

Some stagehands work conventional hours but more often they work nights and weekends. Employment can be intermittent due largely to the seasonal nature of theatrical production work.

Many production companies and venues have union contracts. Stagehands in the United States and Canada are represented by the International Alliance of Theatrical Stage Employees. In smaller productions, stagehands are not all paid; many are volunteers, theatre students or unpaid interns.

== Types of stagehand ==
- Head
- Professional Stagehands
- Audio engineer (A1)
- Assistant audio (A2)
- Video engineer
- Electricians
- Lighting technician
- Light board operator
- Followspot operator
- Carpenters
- Theatrical technician
- Property Master/Mistress
- Rigger
- Wardrobe/costume quick changers
- Deck Audio
- Deck Carpentry
- Deck Lighting (Deck LX)
- Stage Manager
- Assistant Stage Manager
- Utility
- Projectionist
- Grip (job)
- Pusher / Loader

== See also ==
- Running crew
- Theatrical technician
- Fly captain
- Kuroko
