= Dresser (theatre) =

Theatrical stagehand

A dresser is a theatrical stagehand who is involved with maintaining costume quality at each performance, as well as facilitating quick changes. They are hired by either the director, producer, or wardrobe supervisor. They report directly to the wardrobe supervisor and are usually paid by the hour.

Some dressers work closely with an actor over the course of multiple shows, which can lead to a close relationship between the two. Sutton Foster and Daniel Radcliffe acknowledged dressers who worked with them over the years in awards acceptance speeches.

== See also ==
- List of theatre personnel
- The Dresser, a 1980 play about a dresser, afterwards adapted for the cinema (1983) and television (2015)
- Hamlet's Dresser, a 2002 memoir by a dresser
