= Call boy (theatre) =

Stagehand in the theatre

Call boy is the job title of a stagehand in the theatre. They are hired by either the director, producer, or stage crew chief. They report directly to the crew chief, are usually paid by the hour, and will sometimes rotate between several groups from one performance to the next.

== Primary roles ==
The primary responsibility of the call boy or girl is to move from backstage to the dressing rooms and green rooms alerting actors and actresses of their entrances in time for them to appear on stage on cue. For example, they might call out, "You're on in five minutes, Miss Bernhardt."

The call boy or girl also calls the "quarter hour" and "overture and beginners", the preparatory warning that signals for the orchestra to start the introductory music and the beginners, those performers who appear on stage at the beginning of the first act, to get into their opening positions. The call boy or girl also assists with scene changes.

== Etymology ==
The term was already current at the end of the 18th century, when the Shakespearean scholar Edmond Malone claimed that William Shakespeare's first job in the theatre was that of "call-boy".

== Notable people ==
Usually actors themselves, they have historically taken roles and done crowd scenes as needed. The actor William J. Ferguson (June 8, 1845 – May 3, 1930) was the call boy at Ford's Theatre in Washington, D.C., when actor John Wilkes Booth killed President Lincoln and fled. Ferguson was described as the last surviving eye witness. He said he and actress Laura Keene were standing off stage at the first entrance, opposite the president's box, when it occurred. He heard the shot, looked up and saw Lincoln's head slump, then Booth jumped to the stage and rushed between him and Keene.

The term pretty much became obsolete in larger theatres in the mid-20th century, when most call boys were replaced by loudspeakers placed in each dressing room and green room.

== See also ==
- List of theatre personnel
