= Technical crew =

Occupation in entertainment

The technical crew, often abbreviated to the "tech crew" or simply the "crew" (individually often known as "techies", "techs", or "technicians"), are the people employed behind the scenes ("backstage") to control all the technical aspects of creating a concert, play, musical, opera or other live performance. The technical crew can consist of only a few individuals, or be divided up into a multitude of positions depending on the scale and needs of a particular production.

The roles, composition and number of workers in a tech crew can change significantly depending on the nature of an event, and often evolves as the production does. In a small scale production, the technical crew might consist of a single person, operating the lights and controlling the volume of the sounds and music. In a large scale productions, the technical crew can consist of dozens of different departments and may run into the hundreds of individuals. Each department has their own specific job that pertains to their area of expertise, but they are all part of the technical crew.

== Job categories ==
The technical crew on a performance fall into different categories based on area of expertise and responsibilities. The most common categories (those encountered on the largest variety of productions) include: Stage Manager, Production Manager, Rigging, Lighting, Sound, and Technical Directors. Each of these departments have sub-categories, often breaking down tasks in more detail. These sub-categories include board of operators, assistant stage managers, and special effects technician. As the complexity of modern production increases, the need for more specialized roles also increases. It is becoming more common place to find roles like pyrotechnician, automation technicians, and projection designers, particularly in large-scale performances.

== Responsibilities ==
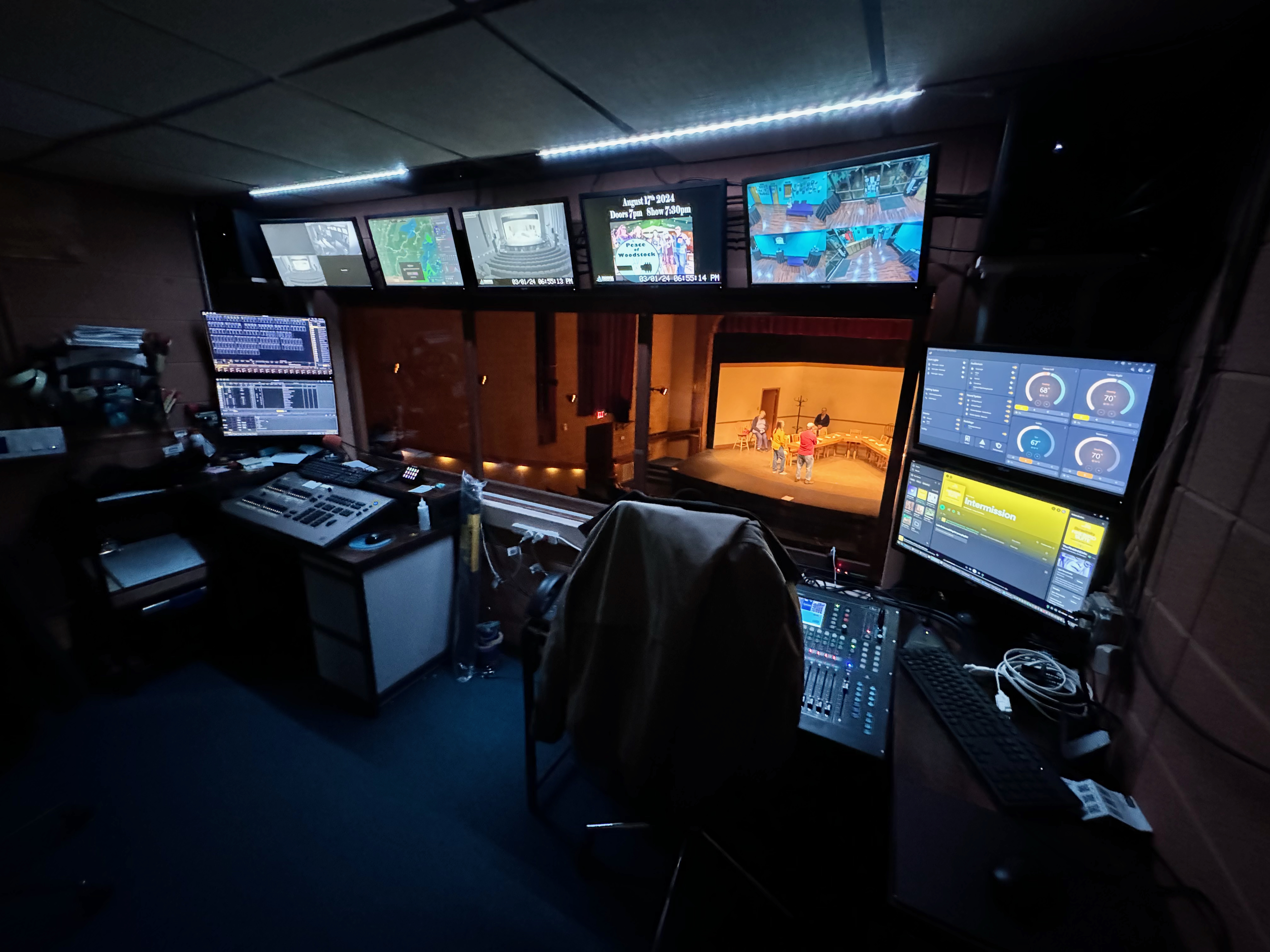
Technical crew operating lighting and sound equipment in a theatre control booth.

Theatre technical crew have significant responsibilities in regards to ensuring that a production runs smoothly. A Stage Manager has to give the cue to the Audio Engineer and Lighting Technician, signal the performers when they are on, ensure that the stage is all set and safe for the performance. Technical crew members that are in charge of special effects such as pyrotechnics, fog dispersal, and strobe lighting must have perfect and synchronized execution. The responsibilities usually extend into equipment maintenance, tech rehearsals, post-show breakdowns, etc.

The nature of most productions result in the technical crew being on-site for significant periods of time; both leading up to and after a performance.

== Sustainability and Innovation ==
Sustainability has increasingly become a bigger concern in technical theater. This prompts both production companies and educational institutions to rethink how they design, operate, and construct a set. Traditionally, the methods that are used today are very high in energy consumption, use single-use materials, and produces non-recyclable waste after they are torn down. Because of this, technical crews are now in charge of finding new strategies to reduce waste and incorporate sustainable designs, while not compromising on the artistic integrity.

Technical crews achieve improved sustainability and reduced waste by using modular scenery, energy-efficient lighting systems(LEDs), and suasible sourcing of materials. Although rare, this approach lead to some productions being designed for the purpose of minimizing environmental impact. This is also done by using recycled lumber, electronics, and fabrics. There has also been a movement that involves donating and actioning set pieces of bigger productions.

== Identifying the technical crew ==
Most often, though not exclusively, members of the technical crew will be wearing black or similarly dark-coloured clothing in order to be fairly inconspicuous, so that they are not particularly distracting to the audience in the carrying out of their routines and tasks. Occasionally, larger scale or touring productions will provide clothing branded with the name and/or date of the production. While this tradition of wearing inconspicuous clothing still persists, newer productions started to integrate smart wear and light sensitive fabrics that help the crew coordinate backstage. This helps the crew stay hidden on stage.

== See also ==
- Film crew
- International Alliance of Theatrical Stage Employees
- Stage management
