= A2 (theater) =

Abbreviation for "Production Audio Technician"

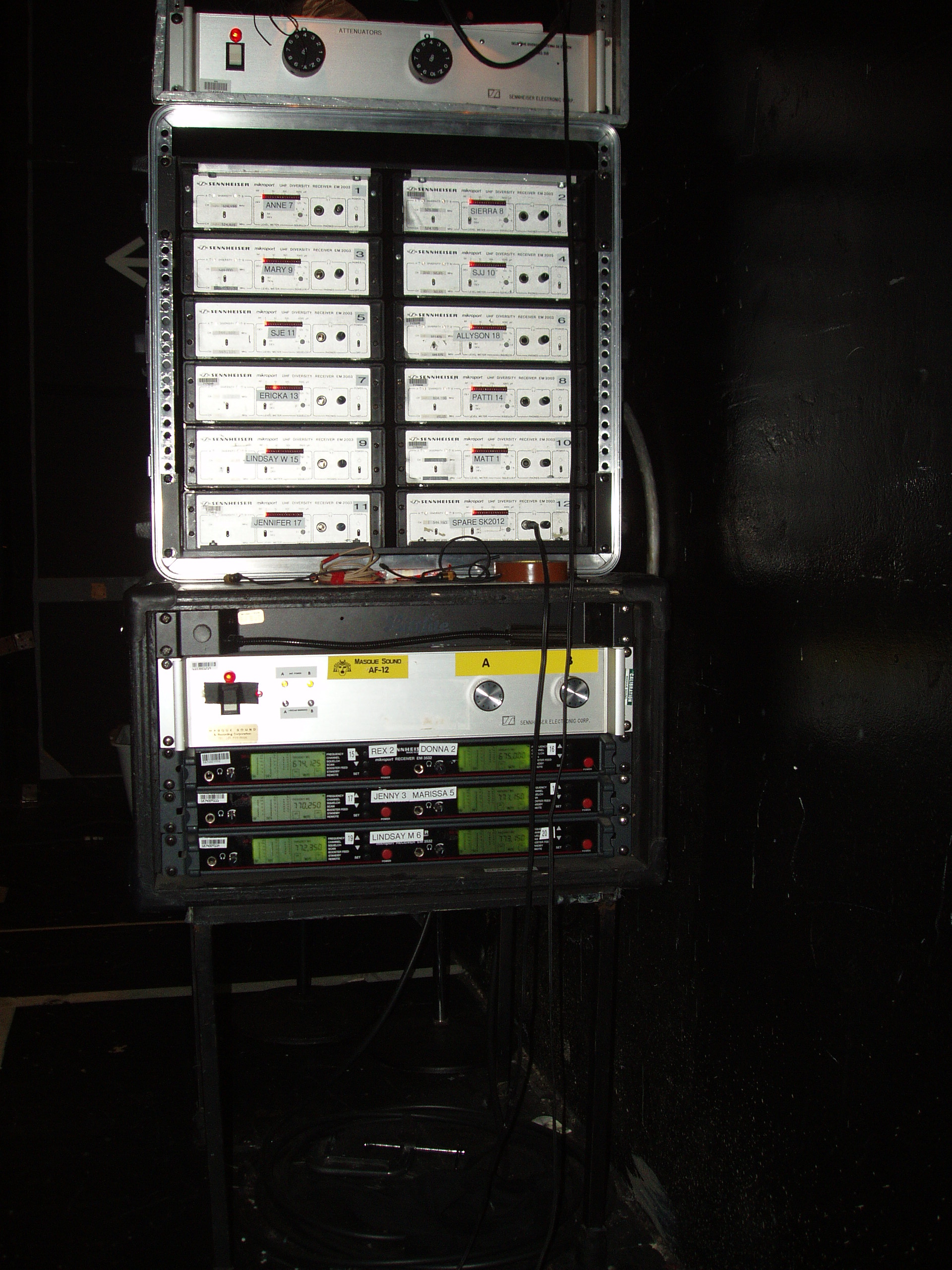
The A2's job may include monitoring a microphone receiver rack such as the one pictured.

A2 is an abbreviation for "Production Audio Technician", Audio Assistant, Second Audio Assistant, or Second Assistant Audio Engineer. Any of these three terms, or any similar term such as Mic Wrangler, may be used to describe the same set of duties.

An A2 is a stagehand who is responsible for the upkeep, acquisition, and use of microphones, backstage monitors, communication systems, and the audio system. There are typically one or two people with this job title associated with any major theatrical production making use of such audio elements. The term "A2" refers to the fact that this person is frequently the second in command on all matters relating to sound during the performance, reporting directly to the Production Audio Engineer, or A1. In addition to their own responsibilities, the A2 often acts as an understudy for the A1.

In touring theatre, the A2 is often responsible for overseeing the load-in of all backstage audio elements.

In musical theatre, the A2 may or may not be the technical liaison to the orchestra, and duties could include monitor mixing, placement and upkeep of microphones in the orchestra, and video feeds to and from the conductor.

== See also ==
- A1 (theater)
- A2 (remote television production)
