= Theatrical technician =

Theatrical occupation

A theatrical technician, also known as a theatrical tech, theatre technician, or theatre tech is a person who operates technical equipment and systems in the performing arts and entertainment industry. Technicians in contrast to performers, is the broad category that contains all "unseen" theatrical personnel who practice stagecraft and are responsible for the logistic and production-related aspects of a performance. The role of theatrical technician should not be confused with the role of a designer, whose role is not to operate the system but to work with the director to create the idea of the system that the tech will put into action, although it is common for the roles of designer and technician to be performed by the same person.

The job of a technician may be volunteer or a paid position. It is not uncommon to receive compensation (such as comp/free tickets to the current or future productions or items used in the show) in other forms than money for pay. This type of compensation allows the person working to receive value for their services while not costing the producer more out-of-pocket expenses. Theatrical technicians are represented by the International Alliance of Theatrical Stage Employees in the United States.

== Classifications ==
Theatrical fields operated by technicians include:

- Theatrical carpentry
- Sound system
- Lighting
- Electrics
- Rigging
- Stage management
- Costume and props
- Special effects

A single theatrical technician may regularly work on one or more of the above fields during load in, load outs (strike), rehearsal and performance. Performance technicians are generally divided between those backstage (stagehands, Stage Managers) and those in a control room (lighting and audio technicians). During load in and load out additional crew members may be needed due to the amount of work required to be completed in a short time span. Larger and more complex shows require larger crews and often personnel with specialized advanced skills to perform these job functions.

=== Carpentry ===
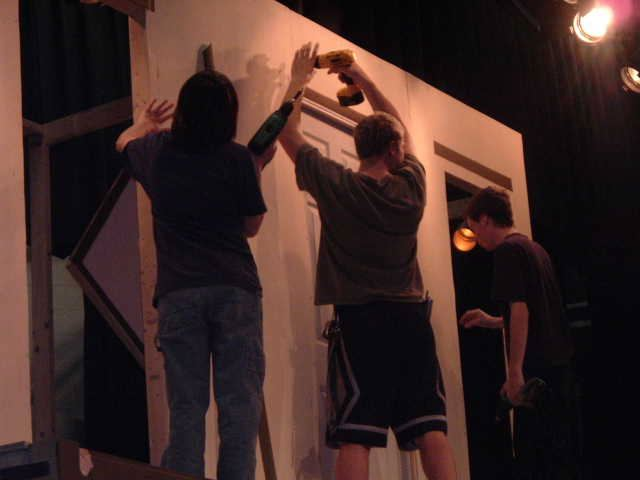
Set construction with set designer

This is the general name for all work involving scenery, including the deck (floor) of the stage.

- Master Carpenter – Although there may be multiple Master Carpenters in a scene shop, typically a performance or tour will only have one. This technician will typically report directly to the Technical Director.
- Carpenter – Multiple carpenters may be attached to a single show, and report to the Master Carpenter. These technicians are responsible both for assembling and building the scenery as well as moving scenic elements during scene shifts. Often these technicians also function as stagehands.

=== Electrics ===
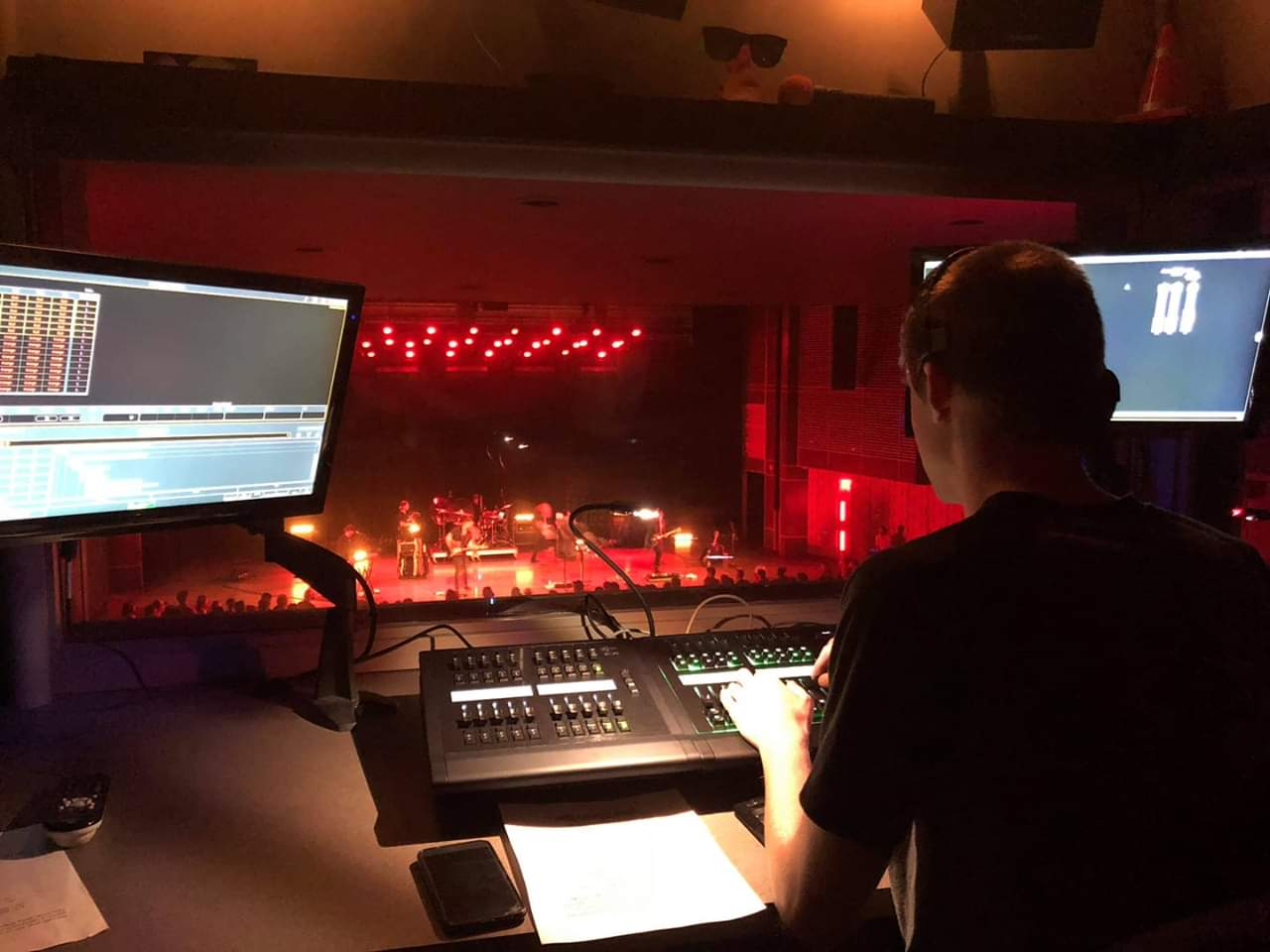
A light board operator controls the light board for a concert.

This department is responsible for all of the onstage lighting for a show including stage lighting and followspots. Electricians are responsible for the assembly, installation, operation and maintenance of the lighting for a production. The Electrics department is also typically in charge of any fog or haze machines used during a production, as well as the configuration of pyrotechnics and other special hardware.

- Master Electrician – The head of the Electrics department on a show, who typically reports directly to the Technical Director, but also sometimes to the Lighting Designer during the development phase of a show.
- Light board operator – The person who operates the light board and controls all the stage lights during a show. In smaller performances and venues, may be the Lighting Designer or the Master Electrician.
- Deck Electrician – Responsible for all electric elements on the stage floor, including roving instruments, fog machines, practicals or lighting installed into scenic pieces.
- Followspot Operators – These technicians operate one or more followspots to track performers during a show

=== Rigging ===
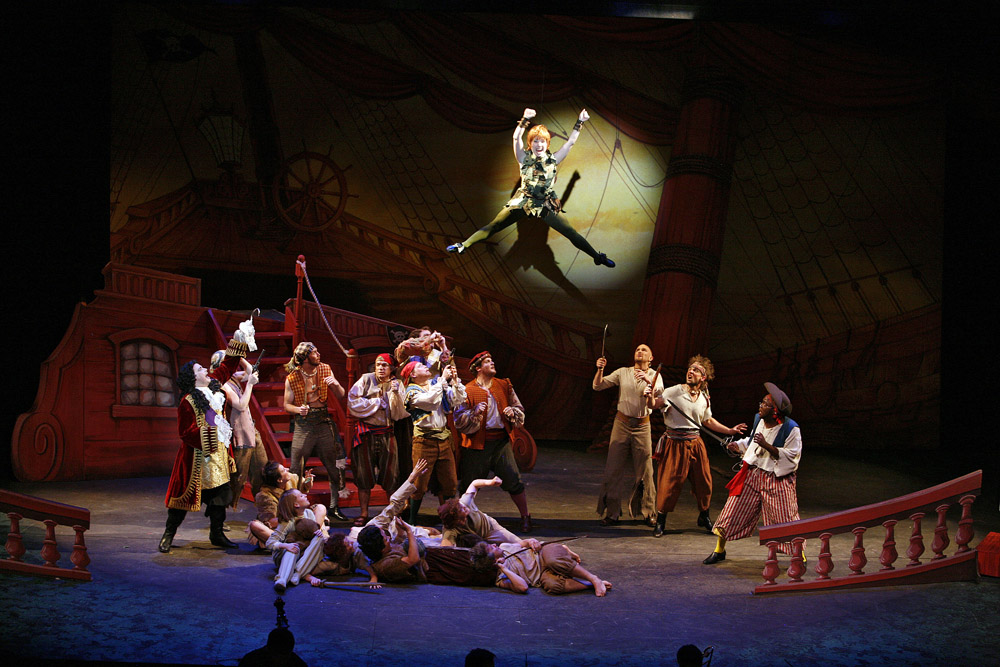
Peter Pan 332 (15584371324)

This department is responsible for all equipment hung (flown) in the theater space. This department varies greatly from show to show, sometimes being absorbed into the Electrics or Carpentry departments. If the production incorporates personnel flying (such as in the staging of Peter Pan), there will usually be designated riggers specifically trained in flying actors. Rigging techniques and traditions come from sailing. Sailors were considered the earliest stagehands in history and many techniques used today for rigging in the theater are from standard uses on boats. Theater technicians today have also incorporated techniques from mountain climbers as well to improve the capabilities of flying equipment in the air.

- Rigger – The general term for persons in this department. If a rigger is specifically assigned to a certain department, they will have a title referencing that department (Electrics Rigger).
- Flyman – Specific term normally used with counterweight rigging system for an operator of the linesets for those systems.

=== Properties ===
The properties or property department is responsible for all hand and scenic props for a show. This usually includes furniture, weaponry and consumables (paper, food and drink) for a production. In addition to the above duties, the props department is responsible for the cleanliness of the stage floor, including sweeping and mopping of the stage surface.

- Props Master / Props Mistress – The head of the properties department. Will also usually be in charge of purchasing or building the props for a show.

=== Audio ===
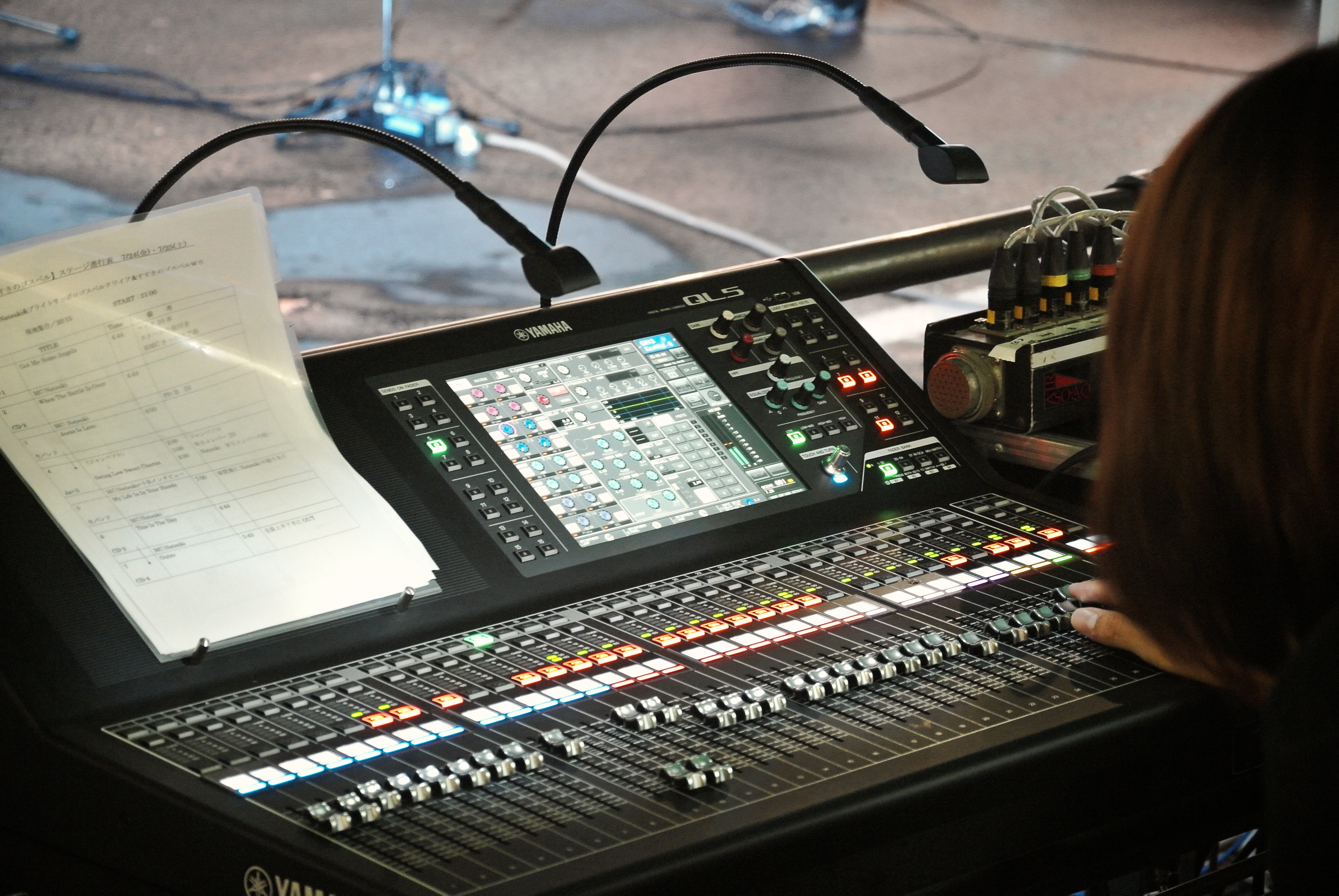
A sound operator using the mixing console

The audio department is responsible for all sound production for a show, including the configuration of microphones, speakers and control equipment, as well as the production of any necessary audio tracks. Personnel in this department include:

- Sound designer or audio engineer, responsible for the configuration of the venue's sound system as a whole, including the placement and designation of microphones, monitors, loudspeakers, and control hardware. This position is often held by an acoustician, especially in large performances requiring musical or orchestral sound reinforcement.
- Sound operator, responsible for the live mixing of the performance's audio at a master sound board. Often referred to as A-1 to designate the first (highest) position of the production audio department. This technician is generally positioned in the back of the audience space, so as to hear the performance's audio directly rather than be forced to use a monitoring system, and is responsible for maintaining volume for performers and musicians while avoiding feedback and other problems.

=== Special Effects ===
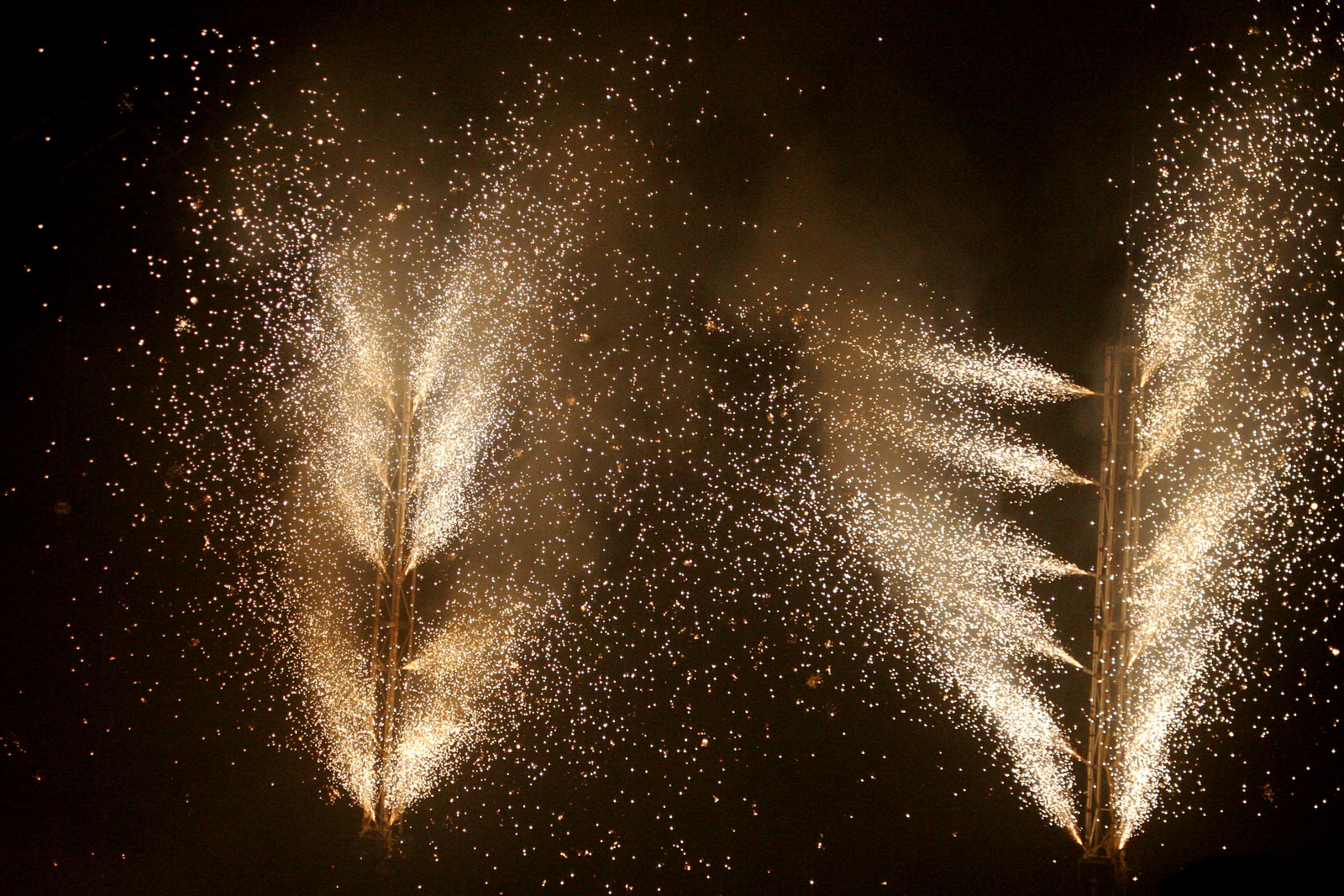
Pyrotechnics

Theatrical technicians are responsible for the production and operation of explosives, special effects and illusions on sufficiently large theatrical productions. Today many of the special effects used on stage have been modernized and are extremely advanced the most commonly used effects are nature, fire, fog and haze. In order to make special effects seem more realistic on stage technicians use innovative techniques and special equipment to bring the production to life across the stage. For nature effects like wind, fans are commonly used to bring movement on stage by adjusting the speed and direction of the fan. For effects like fire, equipment is brought in to create flames and smoke and is usually operated by a licensed special effects operator. Whereas fog and haze machines are easy and accessible for technicians to use and only require fluid to be placed inside the machine to vaporize into fog and haze. These machines also have functions where the flow and speed of the fog and haze can be adjusted to control how its distributed throughout a production.

=== Stage management ===
The stage manager is in control of a production during its run. Responsibilities include calling the cues and determining the starting time of the show and ensuring the safety of all persons involved. Depending on circumstances, multiple positions are possible:

- Production Manager – Typically seen on touring shows or larger permanent venues, this is usually the most senior member of the stage management staff.
- Stage Manager – The usual title applied to the head stage manager assigned to a specific production. This will also be the person who will run a show during performances.
- Deputy Stage Manager – Also known as the "caller", responsible for calling technical (lighting, sound, fly, av etc.) cues at certain times read from the prompt copy (Cue Script).
- Assistant Stage Manager – Typically responsible for the management of property and costume backstage.
- Repertory Stage Manager – Used occasionally if one stage manager oversees multiple productions being performed in repertory. During any one production, would fulfill the duties assigned to the Stage Manager as above.
- Production Assistant – Used in Equity houses (Actor's Equity Association is the union for Stage Managers), this is the non-union equivalent of an Assistant Stage Manager
- Deck Stage Manager – Used in some shows to specifically refer to the Assistant Stage Manager on the deck during a performance.

== Career ==
=== Awards ===
Similarly to other theatrical professions Theatrical Technicians also have various awards they can win that showcase their accomplishments throughout their careers, however technician and backstage awards are much less prevalent and unknown. Here the main 2 awards that a Theatrical Technicians can win.

- ABTT Technician of the Year Award- This is a British based award founded in 1976. ABTT is an organization that helps and supports aspiring theatrical technicians go further into their careers. This award honors both members and non members who showcase great technical skills in theatre.
- USITT Awards - USITT is an American college for technical theatre whose goal is advancing the fields in Technical Theatre. Their awards give newcomers scholarships and grants to their educational programs and also show recognition for people who have made significant contributions to their fields.

=== Well Known Theatrical Technicians ===
George Izenour (1912–2007)

Izenour was an inventor and a theatrical technician and designer. His work led him to hold 27 patents in stage craft and he invented one of the first dimming light system for a theater. Izenour's accomplishments made him one of the founders of modern technical theatre.

Richard Pilbrow (1933–2023)

Richard Pilbrow was lighting designer and theatre consultant. Pilbrow founded the company Theatre Projects, one of he worlds leading theatre design and planning firms. He also was on the USITT board of directors and cofounded the ABTT.

Jean Rosenthal (1912–1969)

Jean Rosenthal was a lighting designer known for her work on West Side Story and Fiddler on the Roof. Her work contributed greatly to the idea of selective visibility and other modern uses of light design. Rosenthal was also an author, publishing The Magic of Light, a guide to lighting theory and best practices.

== See also ==
- Stagecraft
