= Scenery wagon =

Component of theatrical scenery

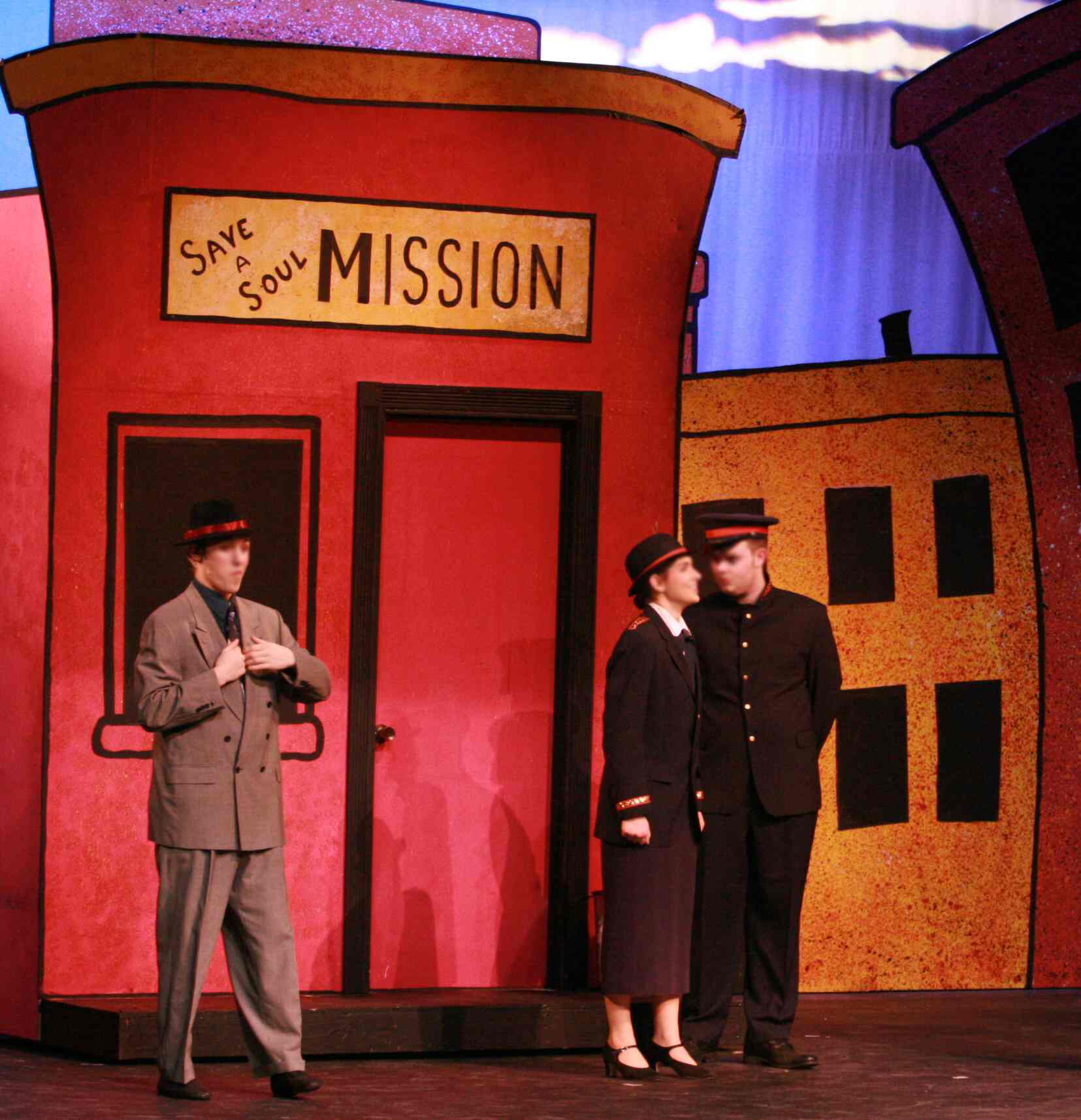
A scenery wagon, used to carry the Save A Soul Mission set piece in a production of Guys and Dolls

A scenery wagon, also known as a stage wagon, is a mobile platform that is used to support and transport movable, three-dimensional theatrical scenery on a theater stage. In most cases, the scenery is constructed on top of the wagon such that the wagon, and the scenery it supports, forms a single, integrated structure. Heavy duty casters are mounted to the underside of the platform so that the entire assembly can be quickly moved onstage or offstage, so as to facilitate rapid scenery changes during live productions. Scenery wagons are built in a wide range of sizes, ranging from less than one square foot up to the size of the playing area of the stage.

Scenery wagons comprise one of the four methods used to move scenery during the course of a theatre performance, the other three being "flying" (suspending) scenery from a fly system, elevating or lowering scenery on a stage lift, or "running" (manually carrying) the scenery.

== Components ==
=== Casters ===
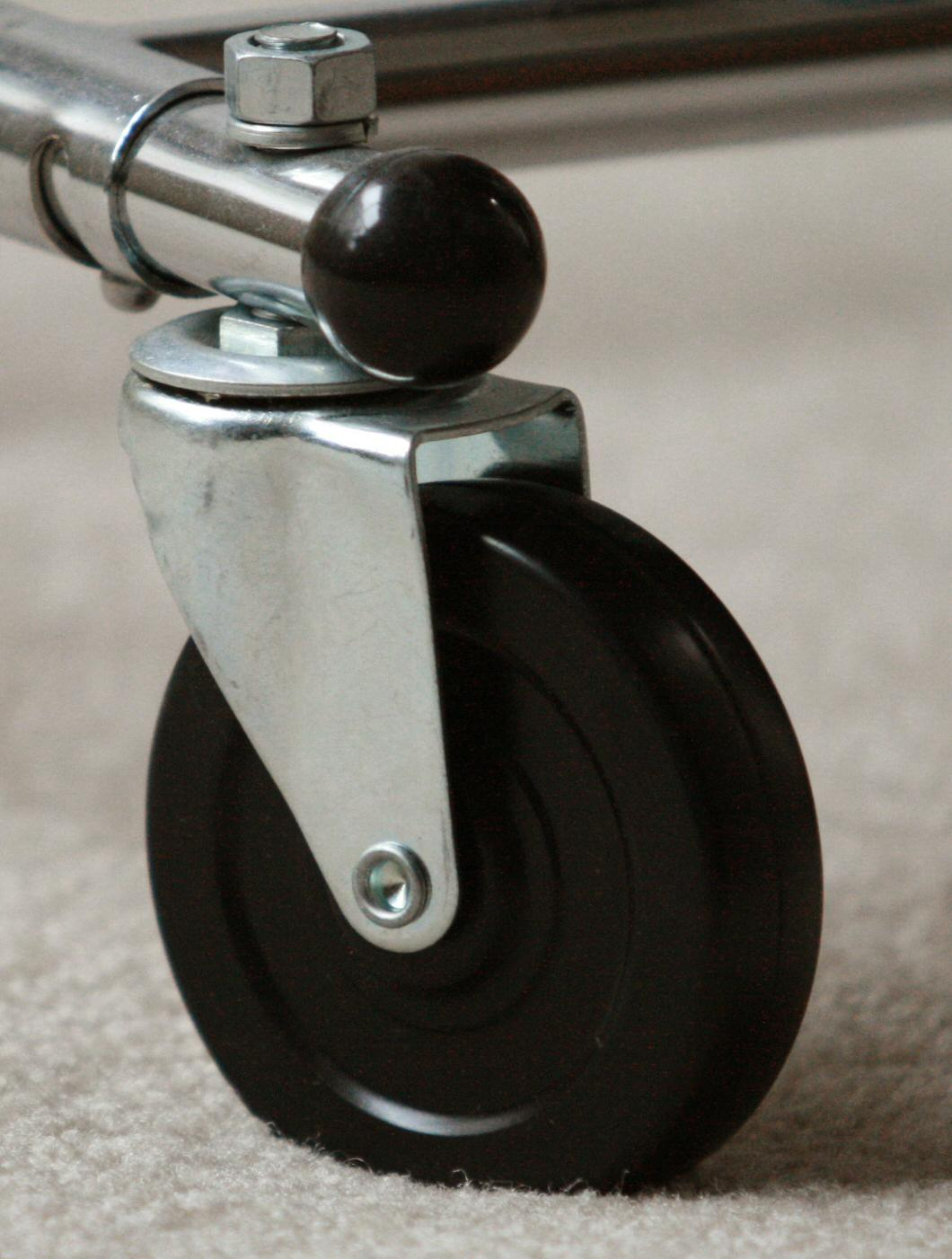
Swivel caster

Various caster types are used on scenery wagons. The choice of caster type for any particular wagon depends on a number of factors, including platform size and shape, scenery weight, production aesthetics and budget. Typically, casters are mounted so that the bottom of the platform is elevated approximately one-half to three-quarters of an inch above the stage. The number of casters required for a wagon depends on caster type and load rating as well as the size, shape and weight of the wagon and scenery.

Swivel casters are commonly used on smaller wagons because of the flexible, omnidirectional mobility they offer. As the number of swivel casters attached to a wagon increases, though, it becomes increasingly difficult to align them. Consequently, it may be difficult or impossible to move a wagon that has a large number of swivel casters when the casters are unaligned. As a result, rigid casters are preferred for larger wagons, which typically require a proportionally higher number of casters.

Air casters are sometimes used in place of rolling casters. These require pressurized air to operate, which produces audible hiss that is undesirable in some situations, and are typically more expensive than rolling casters, but they have the advantage of "locking" the scenery securely in place when depressurized and, like swivel casters, they permit omnidirectional movement.

=== Anchoring systems ===
To effect a scenery change, a wagon is simply rolled offstage to remove it from the set or rolled onstage to its designated position to add it to the set. In the latter case, the wagon must be immobilized after it has been positioned on the stage so that actors can safely interact with it (e.g., walk, stand, or jump on it) without causing the wagon to move. A number of methods and mechanisms are commonly used to immobilize, or "lock" scenery wagons in place:

==== Wedges ====
Wooden wedges may be forced between the stage and the bottom edge of the wagon perimeter. Ideally, the wedges are driven under the wagon to the extent that the wagon is supported by the wedges instead of its casters. Wedges are typically used in pairs, on opposite sides of the wagon so that the wagon can't slip off the wedges.

==== Slip bolts ====
Slip bolts may be used to hold scenery wagons in position when high lateral strength is required and it is permissible to drill holes in the stage. The bolts are mounted to the wagon base and, when the wagon is in position, the bolts are lowered into their designated, predrilled holes.

==== Lift jacks ====
A lift jack is fundamentally a lever that attaches to the scenery wagon platform with a hinge, with a caster mounted to the underside of the lever near the hinge. When no downward force is applied to the lever handle, the wagon rests securely on the stage; this effectively locks the wagon in place due to friction between the wagon platform and the stage. When the lever handle is forced downward, however, the caster serves as a fulcrum to lift the wagon slightly above the stage, thus enabling the unit to be rolled.

Lift jacks may be built into a wagon or onto a wagon's exterior, as circumstances dictate.

==== Wagon brakes ====
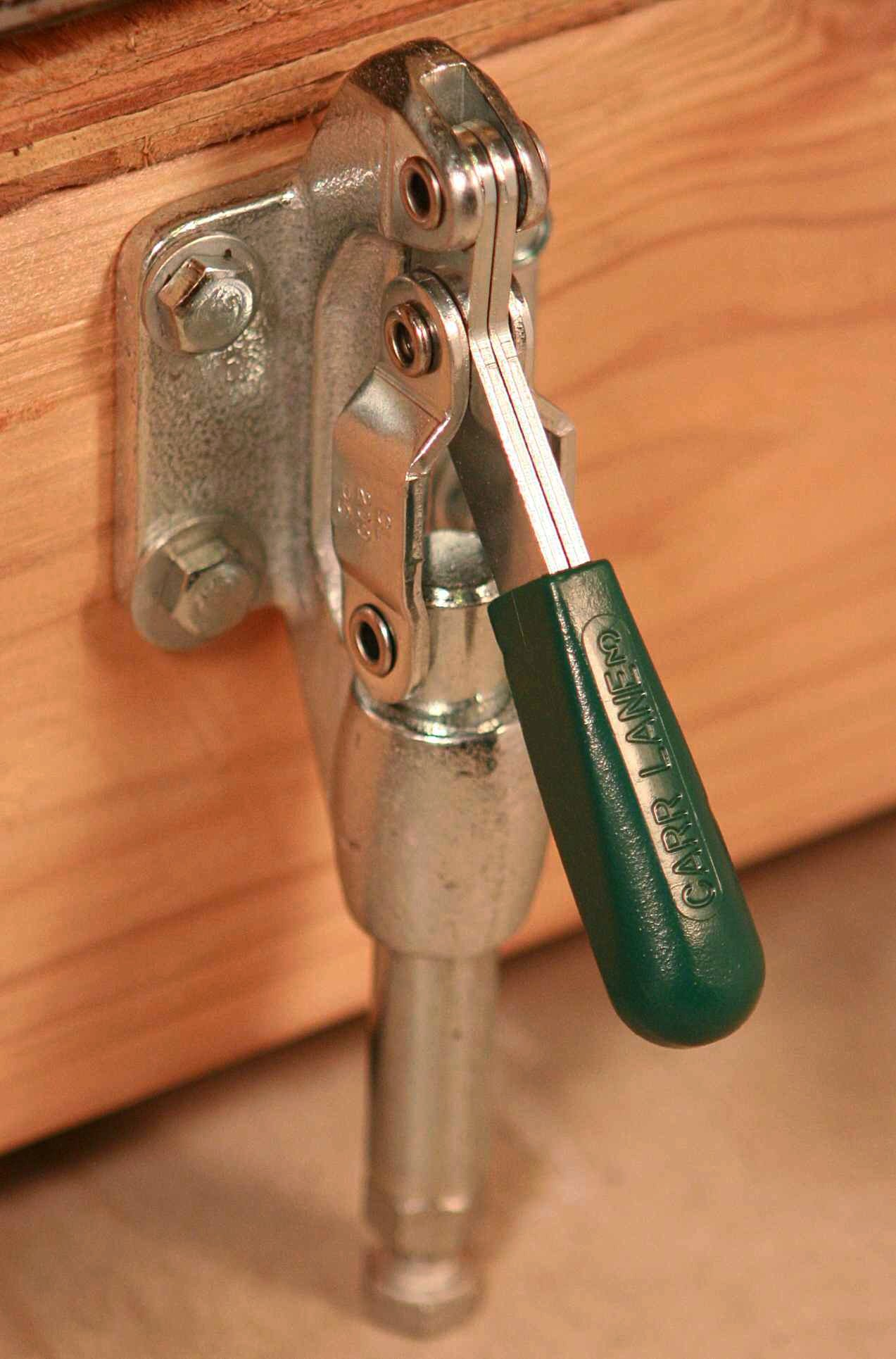
A push-pull toggle clamp employed as a heavy-duty wagon brake

A wagon brake has a handle which, when pushed down, extends a steel rod down and onto the stage. When fully extended, the steel rod actually lifts a section of the wagon slightly off the stage floor. The bottom end of the rod has a threaded cavity that will accept an extension spindle, which in turn can be used to adjust the height of the wagon above the stage. The brake is released by raising its handle, thereby retracting the steel rod away from the stage.

Wagon brakes provide a very fast means of locking and unlocking wagons, but the brakes and stage can be damaged if the running crew attempts to move a wagon while its brakes are engaged. Damage to the stage can be mitigated by using extension spindles with compliant (e.g., polyurethane) tips. Toggle clamps, which are functionally similar to wagon brakes, are sometimes used in lieu of theatrical wagon brakes due to their higher load ratings and more durable construction.

==== Hinged foot irons ====
Hinged foot irons may be bolted to the sides of the wagon. To lock the wagon in place, the free ends of the foot iron hinges are folded down and then secured to the stage with stage screws. This is a reliable method for immobilizing wagons, but it creates holes in the stage and can slow the process of locking and unlocking a wagon. Also, if a foot iron is allowed to contact the stage while the wagon is being moved, the stage floor can be damaged.

== See also ==
- Scenic design
