= Theatrical production =

Theatrical work from a book or script

A theatrical production is any work of theatre, such as a staged play, musical, comedy or drama produced from a written book or script. Theatrical productions also extend to other performance designations such as Dramatic and Nondramatic theatre, as well as Dance theatre. These works are protected by common law or statutory copyright unless in the public domain.

== Production ==
These productions generally feature actors, costumes and sets. The history of the theatrical production goes back to ancient Greece.

Theatrical productions vary in many ways. They can be anything from high school as well as college productions, community theatre productions to summer stock and regional theatre productions all the way to Broadway and Kings Road productions. Today's contemporary theatres produce a variety of plays and musicals that attract very different audiences.

In full theatrical productions there are a great number of people working towards many types of shows. A producer acquires financing, hires staff and oversees everything from the beginning to the end of each show. Theatrical staff is separated by department, which varies from theatre to theatre and production to production depending on needs.

The production will employ front of house and back of house staff. In addition to performers, stage hands, stage managers, lighting and sound technicians, many theatres will hire ushers, concessions workers, janitorial and security in mounting a theatrical production.

== Other performance types ==
Theatrical productions may also involve other types of performance exhibitions, which include improvisational, skit and parody performances which involve varying levels of involvement from off-camera staff or assistants in order to create the productions.
