= Lighting technician =

Occupation

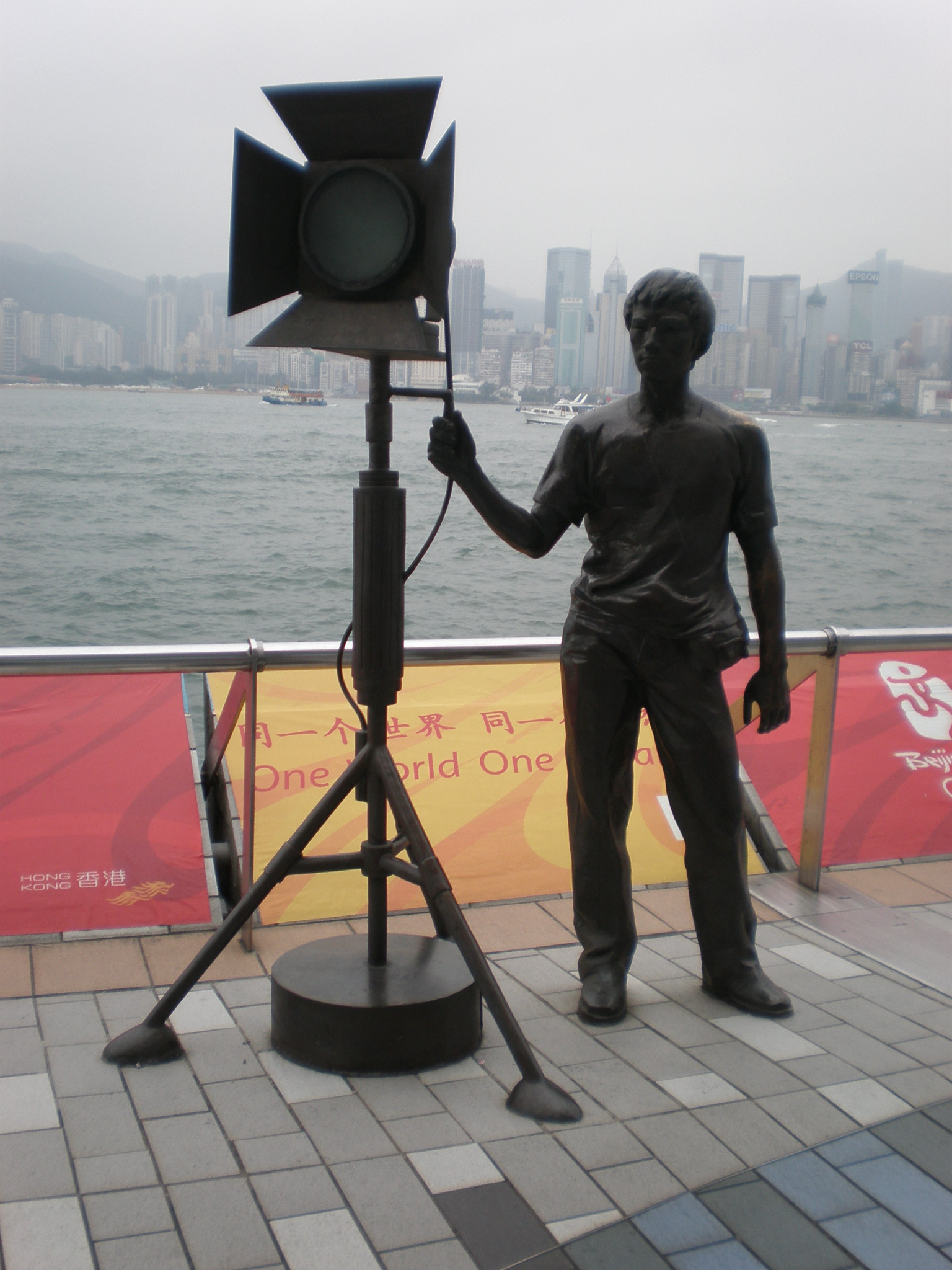
Statue of a lighting technician on the Avenue of Stars, Hong Kong.

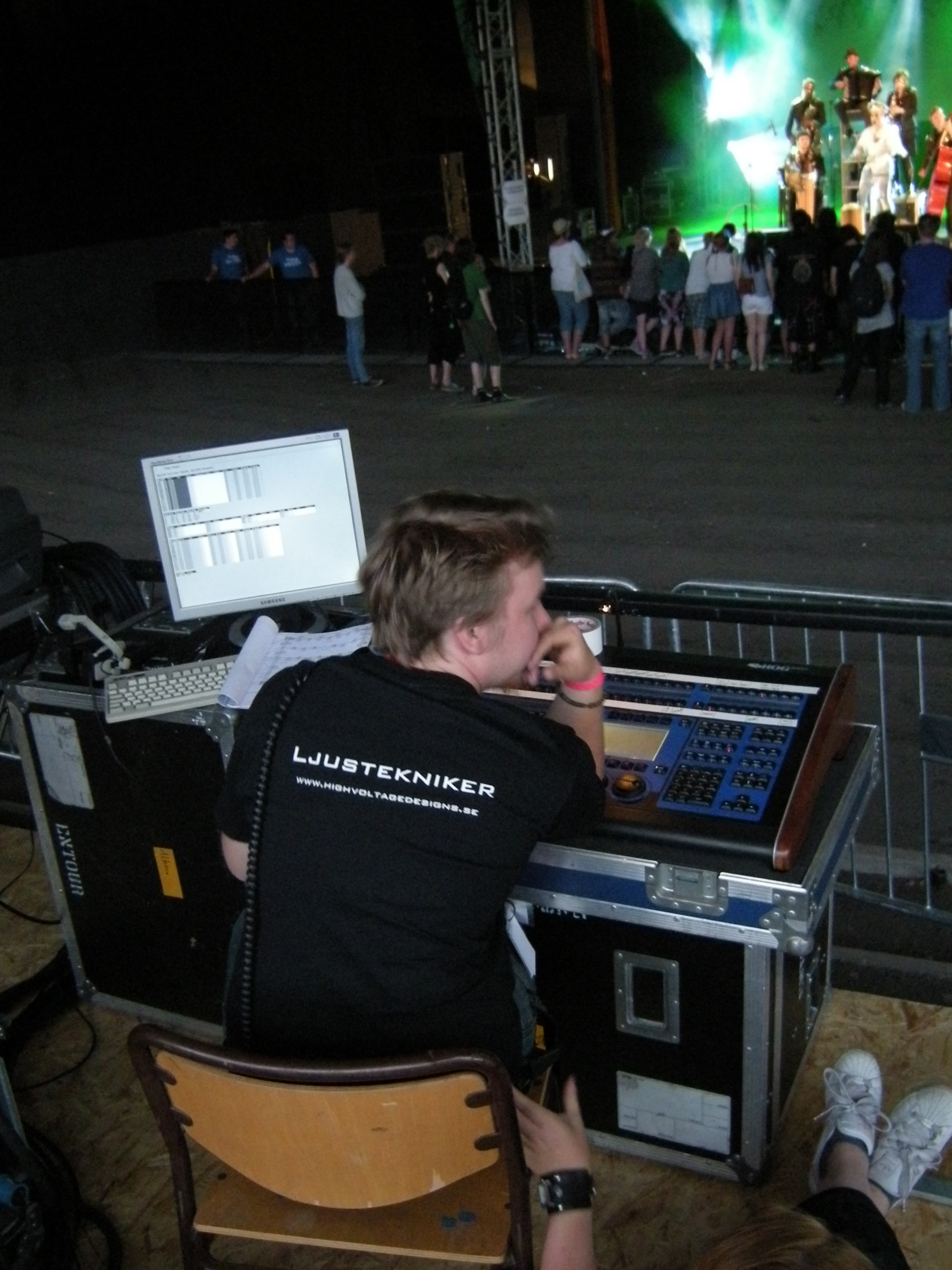
Lighting technician (ljustekniker) at the Peace & Love festival in Borlänge, Sweden.

An electrical lighting technician, or simply lighting technician, is involved with rigging stage and location sets and controlling artificial, electric lights for art and entertainment venues (theatre or live music venues) or in video, television, or film production.

In a theater production, lighting technicians work under the lighting designer and master electrician. In video, television, and film productions, lighting technicians work under the direction of the gaffer or chief lighting technician who takes their direction from the cinematographer. In live music, lighting technicians work under the lighting director. All heads of department report to the production manager.

Lighting technicians are responsible for the movement and set up of various pieces of lighting equipment for separation of light and shadow or contrast, depth of field or visual effects. Lighting Technicians may also lay electrical cables, wire fixtures, install color effects or image patterns, focus the lights, and assist in creating effects or programming sequences.

== See also ==
- Light board operator
- Television crew
