= Theatrical company management =

Company management in a theatre or a travelling company entails all of the travelling, accommodation and day-to-day needs of the acting, design and technical company members. In regional theatres it often includes renting apartments and hotel rooms, booking airline tickets, orchestrating furnishings and cleanings for rented apartments, and dealing with any special needs and requests. Company managers will also often coordinate auditions and aid in contracting actors and creatives.

In a travelling company the company manager also arranges for travel and housing, but might also travel with the production. In most local or regional theaters the company manager takes on the job of being the liaison to the actors. The company manager serves as the direct point of contact of any questions the actors might have and the direct contact from the management team to the actors.

In traveling shows or festivals the company manager might be responsible for all staff issues, such as: travel arrangements and meals for not only the actors but for the entire staff. But in theaters such as Broadway or regional theaters where actors are stationary for a longer run; the company manager takes on the actors and the production manager deals with the tech crew.
