= Master electrician =

Person who implements the lighting design for a stage production

In theatre, the master electrician, or head electrician, (chief electrician in the UK) is responsible for implementing the lighting design for a production drawn up by the lighting designer. This involves overseeing the preparation, hanging, connection and focusing of stage lighting fixtures.

This can be done on a show-by-show basis, or as a resident position of a specific theatre. The tool of the trade of the theatrical master electrician is the adjustable spanner or crescent wrench, used to secure stage lighting instruments from lighting positions in the theatre. This wrench is typically attached to the belt or wrist with a lanyard, which is important because the master electrician tends to work at great height, from ladders, lift tables, catwalks, or lighting trusses, where a falling wrench may hurt people or damage property below.

== Duties ==
The master electrician supervises and is responsible for all other electricians working on any construction or installation project. Only the master electrician can pull the permits with the electrical authority, and they can only be registered with one electrical contracting company at any one time. Other electrical duties performed by any electrician include:

- Inventory and repair and maintenance of all lighting fixtures, cables, effects, power distribution, dimmers, networking and lighting control consoles.
- Organisation and purchasing of all consumables including color gel, gobos, Sharpies, and gaffer tape.
- Planning and implementing of the cabling (circuiting) of lights and electric power distribution.
- Documenting and tracking of all circuiting, addressing, and system configuration in cooperation with the Lighting Designer.
- Patching assignments of the control console based on the paperwork generated by the lighting designer and the planned circuiting.
- Occupational safety and health of workers and operational decisions as the head of the electrics department.

== Training, origin, and professional affiliations ==
Master electricians go through extensive on-site and classroom training, with work in more formal settings such as schools or colleges. The designation "master" is only given to electricians who can display extensive job knowledge and are tested to have an extensive understanding of the electrical safety code.

There are no formal certifications of the "theatrical title, master electrician", as there are in some of the more mainstream trades, but in March 2003 ESTA developed a certification process. Those who pass this rigorous test will become ETCP Certified Entertainment Electricians - and will be recognized as the industry's best. The stagehands union, IATSE, come close in that they offer apprentice and journeyman levels of certification. In the future, IATSE, or some of the larger local affiliations may form a more formal method of certification, which may include the title of master electrician. In the meantime, almost every production, from high school shows to Broadway uses the term to describe their primary electrician, regardless of their skill level or experience.
