= Spotlight operator =

Technician that operates spotlights

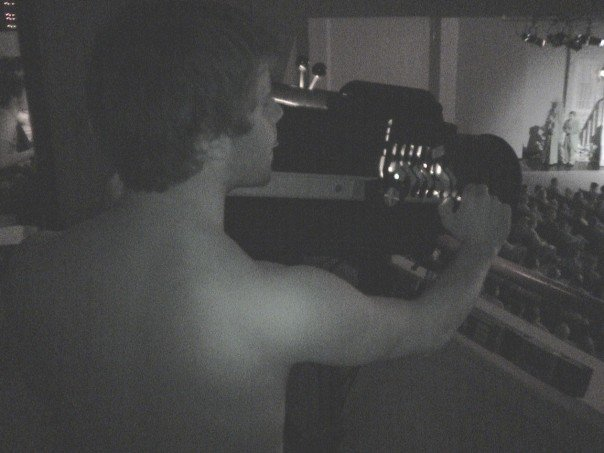
A followspot operator

The spotlight operator or followspot operator is a theatrical technician who operates a specialized stage lighting instrument known as a followspot. A followspot is any manually controlled lighting instrument which is manipulated within the duration of a live performance. Generally, a followspot will be a dedicated, large lighting instrument designed to pan, change size, beam width, and color easily.

== Followspot controls ==
Followspot operators manually control multiple different aspects of the light. Operators control the size, shape, focal length, and intensity of the light. Operators may use Colored magazines and gels to alter the followspot's hue.

== Communication between operators ==
The lead follow-spotter may cue the other operators verbally. Additionally, cue sheets may be utilized. In an arena field or at large music events, the term "Douse" may be substituted with the term "Fade". There are some minor differences in terminology between the operators in live theatre and concert venues, however other aspects remain the same.

== Positioning the followspot ==
In professional theatre, auditoriums, arenas, amphitheaters, performing arts centers. community and school theaters, spot operators may use a reflector sight. The reflector sight is attached to the followspot, allowing the operator to align the follow spot more accurately. The operator, when looking through a Telrad, will see multiple red rings which may be dimmed to assist in low lighting. Often times the placement location's distance and alignment of the sight's housing unit on the spotlight, in relation to the operator's eyes, will allow the rings to align with the standard sizes of head illumination, half body illumination, and full body illumination. The various distances of spot light location set up positioning based on the venue's size and the spot locations may also affect the need for devices to assist in aiming.

== See also ==
- Stage lighting
- Stage lighting instrument
- Light board operator
- Deck electrician
- Super Trouper
