= Costume designer =

Person who designs costumes for a film, stage production or television show

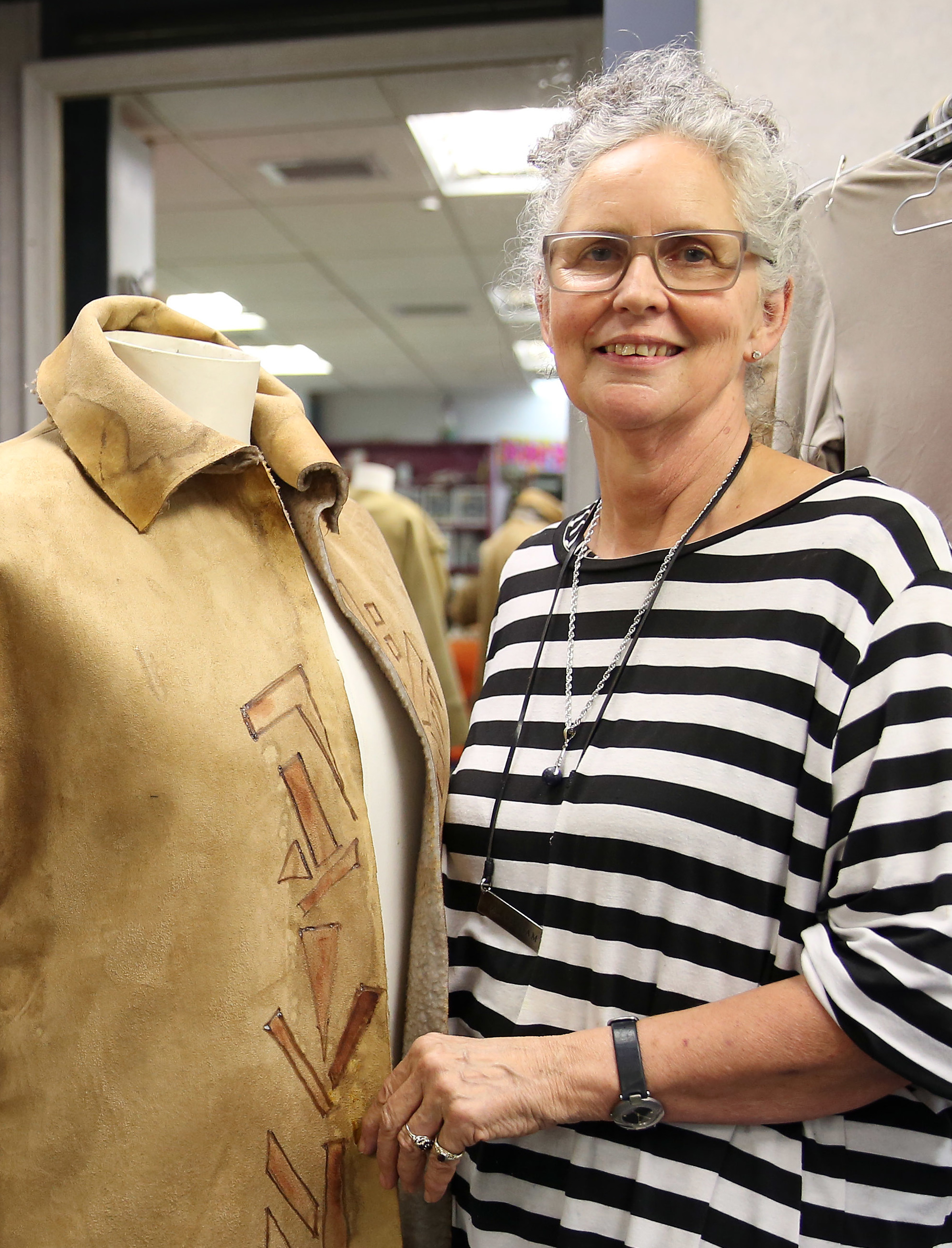
Elizabeth Whiting, costume designer for New Zealand Opera (2016)

A costume designer is a person who designs costumes for a film, stage production or television show. The role of the costume designer is to create the characters' outfits or costumes and balance the scenes with texture and colour, etc. The costume designer works alongside the director, scenic, lighting designer, sound designer, and other creative personnel. The costume designer may also collaborate with a hair stylist, wig master, or makeup artist. In European theatre, the role is different, as the theatre designer usually designs both costume and scenic elements.

Designers typically seek to enhance a character's personality, and to create an evolving plot of color, changing social status, or period through the visual design of garments and accessories. They may distort or enhance the body—within the boundaries of the director's vision. The designer must ensure that the designs let the actor move as the role requires. The actor must execute the director's blocking of the production without damaging the garments. Garments must be durable and washable, especially for plays with extended runs or films with near-real time pacing (meaning that most costumes will not change between scenes) but whose principal photography phase may stretch across several weeks. The designer must consult not only with the director, but the set and lighting designers to ensure that all elements of the overall production design work together. The designer must possess strong artistic capabilities and a thorough knowledge of pattern development, draping, drafting, textiles and fashion history. The designer must understand historical costuming, and the movement style and poise that period dress may require. Designers must be creative with the clothes they create while understanding the character and how they're supposed to look.

== History ==
During the late-19th century, company managers in the US usually selected costumes for a show. Many were pulled from a rental houses, only a few were designed. Though designers in other theatrical disciplines were recognized, few who specialized in costumes were. The few that were included Caroline Siedle, C. Wilhelm, Percy Anderson, and Mrs. John Alexander. They sometimes even received credit on the title page of a playbill rather than in the back.

In the 20th century, film costume designers like Edith Head and Adrian became well known. Edith Head (born Edith Claire Posener) won eight Academy Awards for Best Costume Design between 1949 and 1973. Later, those working in television like Nolan Miller (Dynasty), Janie Bryant (Mad Men), and Patricia Field (Sex and the City) became more prominent, some becoming authors and having their own clothing and jewelry lines.

== Types of costume designers ==
Professional costume designers generally fall into three types: freelance, residential, and academic.

- Freelance designers are hired for a specific production by a film, theatre, dance or opera company. A freelancer is traditionally paid in three instalments: Upon hire, on delivery of final renderings, and opening night of the production. Freelancers are not obligated to any exclusivity in what projects they work on, and may design for several productions hired by a specific theatre, dance or opera company for an extended series of productions. This can be as short as a summer stock contract, or may be for many years.
- A residential designer is consistently "on location" at the theatre—at hand to work with costume studio and other collaborators. A residential designer's contract may limit the amounts of freelance work they are allowed to accept. Residential designers tend to be more established than strict freelancers, but this is not always the case.
- An academic designer is one who holds professorship at a school. The designer is primarily an instructor, but may also act as a residential designer to varying degrees. They are often free to freelance, as their schedule allows. In the past, professors of costume design were mostly experienced professionals that may or may not have had formal post-graduate education, but it has now become increasingly common to require a professor to have at least a Master of Fine Arts in order to teach.

Both residential and academic designers are generally also required to act as Shop Master or Mistress of an onsite costume shop, in addition to designing productions. In a resident theatre, there is almost always a shop staff of stitchers, drapers, cutters and craft artisans. In an academic environment the shop "staff" is generally students, who are learning about costume design and construction. Most universities require costume design students to work a specified number of hours in the shop as part of their course work.

== Unions in the United States and Canada ==
The International Alliance of Theatrical Stage Employees is one of the major unions in the United States and Canada that represents costume designers. It has three major local unions that costume designers can belong to:

Costume Designers Guild (Local 892), the United Scenic Artists, and the Associated Designers of Canada (Local ADC 659).

Many costumers belong to the Motion Picture Costumers Union, Local 705 and represent every position within the costume department (except the costume designer). Local 705 represents Costume Supervisors, Key Costumers, Costumers, Tailor/Seamstress, Ager/Dyer, Cutter/Fitters, Costume House Employees and Commercial Costumers.

== See also ==
- Costume design
- Filmmaking
- List of film formats
- List of motion picture-related topics
- Stagecraft
