= Property master =

Person overseeing props for a production

The property master, often called the props master, is an artistic and organizational employee in a film, television or theatrical production who is responsible for purchasing, acquiring, manufacturing, properly placing, and/or overseeing any props needed for a production. The property master also works with other members of the production managing the physical appearance of the stage or set; for example, they might work with the script supervisor to maintain set continuity. The property master is on staff during preproduction, develops the stylistic concept of the physical production, then continues on as a member of the physical shooting/production crew. A person responsible for purchasing the props can be called a props buyer or production buyer.

== Role ==
During preproduction, the prop master develops a props breakdown. This is essentially mapping out the logical progression of each prop throughout the story. In film and television productions the prop master maintains the logical progression while shooting by ensuring the props are positioned in their correct logical place for each scene according to the props breakdown. If the logical progression of a prop changes during shooting, the props breakdown is revised to reflect the change.

This job description varies somewhat from country to country. In the United States, food styling, weapons and animals are often directly or indirectly within the property master's domain.

The job is a collaboration with the director, production designer, cameraman, set decorator and other members of the production to physically express their stylistic and aesthetic requirements. They maintain their own budget. There are physical aspects of productions that are managed by specialists other than the property master, for example costume designers are responsible for the actors' dress, and weapons masters are responsible for any weapons (firearms, blades, staff-based or otherwise).

In professional theatre, the property master is responsible for the setup and organization of the props. The property master is directed by the director.
