= Electrician (theatre) =

Person who works with various aspects of theatre lighting

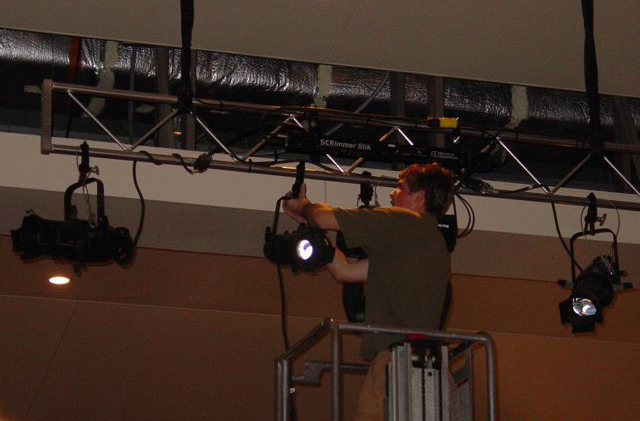
An electrician hangs stage lights

In theatre, an electrician is a person who works with the various aspects of lighting. Some of the positions among electricians include the lighting supervisor, master electrician, deck electrician, light board operator, moving light programmer, followspot operator, as well as simply electricians. This group is generally known as the "Electrics" Department or LX Department.

These people are responsible for receiving the light plot from the lighting designer and translating the design as it is on paper to the lighting that is seen by the audience in the final production. In small theatres, many of these roles may be filled by a single person, while in a large production such as those on Broadway or a large tour, there may be several people filling some of the roles.

== Duties ==
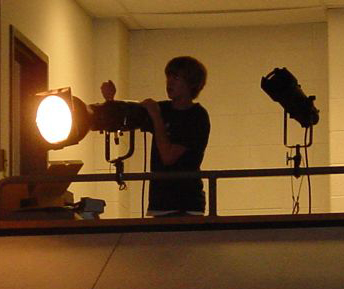
An electrician focuses a light

Theatre electricians are responsible for all non-design aspects of the lighting in a theatrical production. They may also be responsible for special effects (such as fog) and powering other electrical items (such as motors) used in the production.

Electricians install (hang), point and shape the beam (focus), and connect to power (circuit) lighting instruments. Additionally they may add gel to color the light, patterns (or gobos) to create texture or shape a light into pictures, and accessories that give the designer the ability to change some aspect of the light, such as scrollers (color changers) or pattern effects (gobo rotators).

Electricians collaborate with lighting designers and directors to understand the artistic vision of the production. They interpret lighting plots and design schematics to determine the placement of fixtures, types of bulbs, and required power distribution. Installation of lighting equipment involves mounting, wiring, and configuring various types of fixtures such as spotlights, floodlights, and LED panels. Programming and operation of lighting consoles to control intensity, color, and movement of lights during performances. In the past (and even in some theatres today) the electrics department was in charge of all water and water effects used on or offstage (i.e. rain, waterfalls, pools, etc.).

== Positions ==
=== Lighting supervisor ===
The lighting supervisor is responsible for acting as the go-between for the designers, and the theatre's electrics staff. In the cases of shows done in repertory, they may have to adapt the designs of several designers to work together given the limits of the venue and the equipment, budget, and time available. In the case of a re-mount, they may adapt a design to newer equipment or a different venue than the design was originally created for. While Broadway and high end Off-Broadway productions have this position, the Master Electrician is often responsible for these duties in smaller productions.

=== Deck electrician ===
The deck electrician, "stage electrician", "floor electrician", "floor LX", "deck elec"or just "stage LX" is a member of the running crew for a production and is responsible for all aspects of running the lighting for the show that happen on or backstage. This can include such things as changing color, focusing and readjusting lights that were moved, connecting and disconnecting practical units or set pieces which are electrified, and in some venues, assisting with motor control or effects. On touring or musical productions this individual is also referred to as the Dimmer Technician, as their responsibilities include supervising and maintaining portable dimmer racks.

=== Load in electrician ===
The Load in electrician or "production electrician" in the UK, often referred to simply as an electrician, is a person usually hired on a per day or per project basis (freelance) to hang, circuit and focus the lights. Once the show goes into tech, the Load in Electrician will usually leave, although they may stay around to do "notes" with the lighting designer which may include adding or taking away lights, refocusing, or re-gelling lights. Even small productions usually have at least one or two Load in Electricians who are supervised by the Master Electrician. Electricians work closely with other members of the technical team, including stage managers, sound engineers, and set designers, to coordinate all aspects of the production.

=== Light board operator ===
The light board operator, lighting operator, board op or just LX op is the person who executes cues for a production. This can range from adjusting light levels of individual dimmers, such as on a two scene preset board, to simply pressing a "Go" button on a computer controlled console. They may need to be able to write cues for their lighting board, and to make adjustments quickly to account for equipment failure, or people being in the wrong location. For some live events, such as concerts, this person may also be creating cues and looks on the fly, and functioning both as an operator and a designer simultaneously.

=== Master electrician ===
The master electrician, M.E. or head electrician, H.E. (chief electrician in the UK) supervises all other Electricians working on a production or show. In a touring house they may be refereed to as the House Electrician. Their other duties include:

- Planning and implementing of the cabling (circuiting) of lights and electric power distribution for any given show or production.
- Inventory and repair and maintenance of all stage lighting fixtures, cables, effects, power distribution, dimmers, networking and lighting control consoles.
- Organization and purchasing of all consumables including gels, gobos, and gaff tape.
- Documenting and tracking of all scenery, circuiting, addressing, and system configuration in cooperation with the Lighting Designer.
- If there are no light board ops, the Master Electrician may need to patch the board according to the L.D.'s designs.
- Solving any problems or issues with the electrical equipment that the Deck Electricians cannot resolve by themselves.
- Occupational safety and health of workers and operational decisions as the Head of the Electrics department.

In certain jurisdictions of North America however, the title of Master Electrician is protected and can only be used by electricians with a formal education and licensed by their professional order.

=== Lighting programmer ===
The lighting programmer, is a person familiar with the lighting board being used who sits next to or in communication with the lighting designer during "tech". He or she is responsible for programming in the lighting cues as dictated to him or her by the lighting designer. This saves the designer the time and attention of using the light board and allows him or her to concentrate on building the cues. Often, especially in smaller theatres, this person is the Light Board Operator for the show's run. They also troubleshoot electrical issues, such as malfunctioning fixtures, dimmers, or control systems, diagnosing problems and implementing solutions quickly to minimize downtime.

=== Moving light programmer ===
The moving light programmer is a person who specializes in the sometimes complex creation of cues for moving lights. For large productions with several moving lights, there may even be a separate control system for the moving lights from that of the "conventional" lighting. Some of these lights, in addition to being able to change focus from one location to another, can include many other features such as color and patterns. The coordinating of these fixtures can be complex enough to require a dedicated person to program. Electricians must be adaptable and innovative, capable of improvising and problem-solving in real-time to meet the evolving needs of the production.

=== Followspot operator ===
The followspot operator is the person who operates the followspot, or spotlight on a production. This is a light which is physically moved by the operator during the production to follow a performer's movement around the stage. A follow spot may also have mechanisms to change color, as well as an iris to change the diameter of the projected circle of light. The followspot operator may have to change several aspects of the beam from their unit simultaneously. This position is more common in musical theatre and concerts than for drama.
