= Production management (performing arts) =

Performing arts field for live events

Production management in the performing arts is a field responsible for managing and coordinating the production of live events. The specific responsibilities of a production manager may vary between performing arts disciplines (theatre, music, dance, etc., and typically involve overseeing the technical departments such as scenic, costume design, lighting, sound, projection, automation, video, pyrotechnics, stage management, etc.) and coordinating with creative teams, producers and administrative staff. It can be considered a sub-division of stagecraft.

Production managers are responsible for the visions of producers and the artists, such as directors and choreographers. This may involve dealing with matters ranging from the procurement of staff, materials and services, to freight, customs coordination, telecommunications, labor relations, logistics, information technology, government liaison, venue booking, scheduling, operations management, mending delay problems and workplace safety. In addition to management and financial skills, a production manager must have detailed knowledge of all production disciplines including a thorough understanding of the interaction of these disciplines during the production process. They often with closely with a technical director.

== Touring music ==
The production manager of a musical ensemble is in charge of the technical crew. The technical crew moves independently of the band because the technical crew must arrive at the gig location by the morning of the show to start setting up the equipment. The band members usually arrive much later, just before the event itself.

As the tour is being planned, the production manager must contract for services such as lighting, sound, trucking, rigging, bussing, and catering. The competition is fierce between the companies offering such services. Specific discussions must take place between the production manager and the providers clarifying the quality of the equipment, management and crew, as well as the prices bid.
