= Fly crew =

A fly crew is a group of people who are in charge of maintaining and operating the fly system during theatre production. A member of a fly crew is also called a flyman. Despite the name, there is no gender restriction in order to work within a fly crew.

Working as a member of the fly crew often requires being able to pay close attention and having physical strength and agility. During the performance, operators of the fly system will often be involved with changing the scenery or other stage effects on stage. Members of the fly crew may spend a lot of time waiting for predefined cues for operating the fly system: as a result, it is very important for the fly crew to pay close attention to signals given. During tech rehearsals, the fly crew is in charge of inspecting the fly system, maintaining the weight balance, and installing the scenery, lighting and other equipment needed for the show.

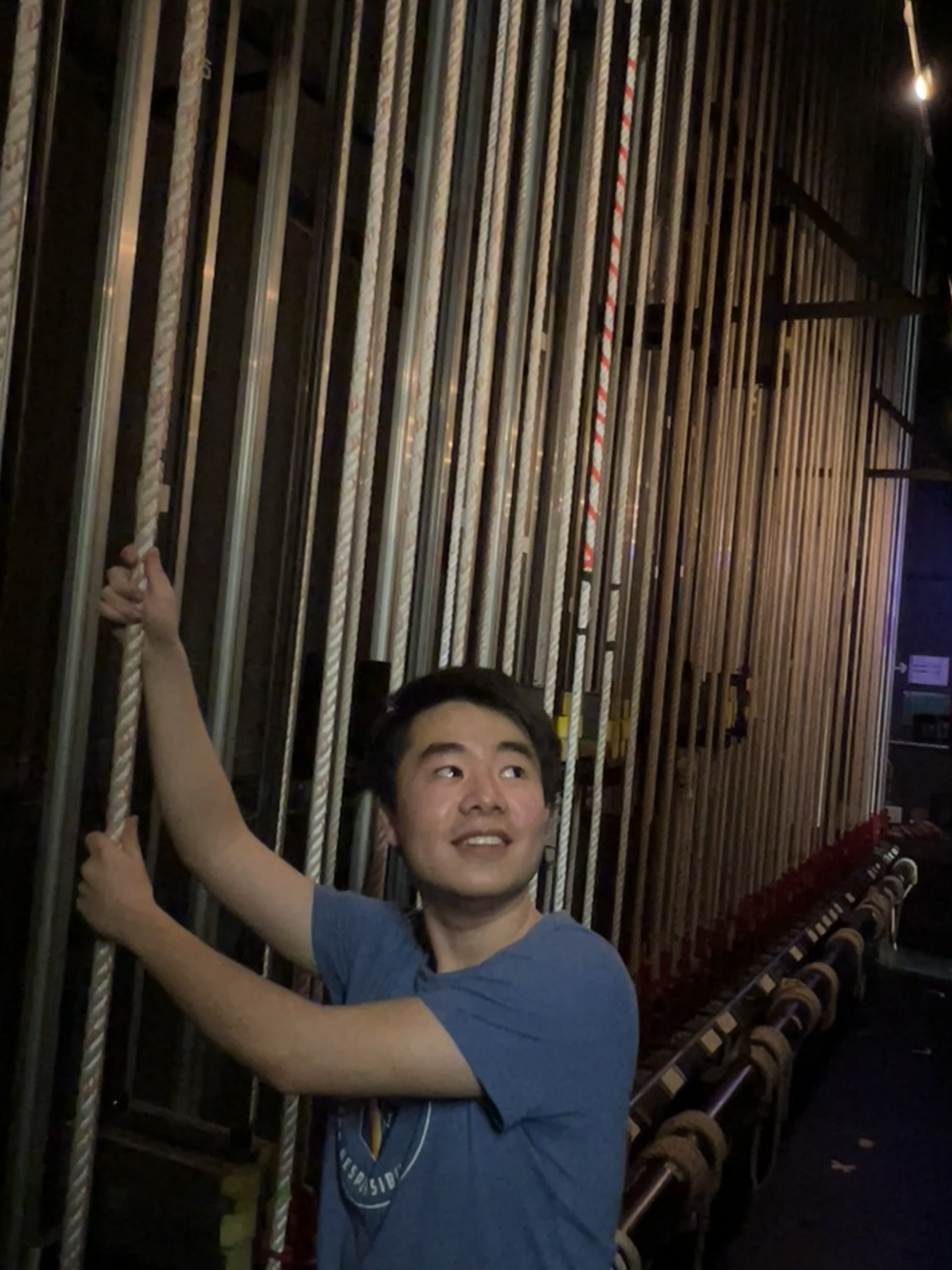
A UB student operating the fly system

To maintain the balance of the fly system, the fly crew needs to climb up to the loading gallery on top of the stage. Therefore, loaders, members of the fly crew who are in charge of loading and unloading the weight, must be able to work high above the ground. The entire fly crew is usually supervised by the head flyman during the production of the show.

== Language and verbal cues ==
Whistling backstage is considered a dangerous action. Before the implication of tele-communication for theatre production, the fly crew used to use whistling as a verbal cue for operating the fly system. As a result, whistling backstage could interfere with the operations and cause an accident on stage. It is for the same reason that in modern-day theatre, the use of the word "go" is not allowed backstage because it has the chance to trigger certain cues on stage, such as lighting and scenery movement.

In order to operate the fly system safely, the fly crew needs to mention the number of the batten (pipe) that is going down or up. For example: "Pipe number 3, coming in. Heads up!"

== Safety ==
Working with fly system is a challenging and dangerous task due to the large amount of weight and great heights involved. A run-away line, for example, might injure the operator or others in the way of the moving equipment, and a counterweight dropped from the grid could kill or injure a person standing below. Therefore, to ensure the safety of the workers and the performers on stage, certain safety guidelines have been implemented to the fly crew during the operation. Here are some general safety rules that can reduce the amount of accidents happen while working with fly system.

- Know the fly system you are working with, for example the capacity of the system.
- Keep clear communication with others who are working on stage.
- Always wear personal protective equipment while setting up the system.
- Always shout out warnings and run away from stage when things fall on top of the stage.
- Always inspect the integrated fly system.
- Always keep the counterweight system on balance.
- Load your equipment and sets first and then the arbor.

== Context ==
This article uses terms common in the USA. Different vocabulary may be used in other English-speaking countries.
