= List of ray tracing software =

Ray tracing software is a kind of simulation software that is based on ray tracing, a technique that can be used to generate photorealistic images from computer simulations. A wide range of free software and commercial software is available for producing these images; notable examples are listed below.

Software	License	Platforms			
Software	License	Windows	macOS	Linux	Other
3Delight	Proprietary	Yes	Yes	Yes	No
3DOptix	Free	Yes	Yes	Yes	Cloud
Amiga Reflections	Proprietary	No	No	No	Amiga
Autodesk 3ds max	Proprietary	Yes	No	No	No
Autodesk Maya	Proprietary	Yes	Yes	Yes	No
Autodesk Softimage	Proprietary	Yes	No	Yes	No
Anim8or	Freeware	Yes	No	No	No
ASAP	Proprietary	Yes	No	No	No
Bella Render	Proprietary	Yes	Yes	Yes	No
Blender	GPL	Yes	Yes	Yes	No
Brazil R/S	Proprietary	Yes	No	No	No
BRL-CAD	BSD, LGPL	Yes	Yes	Yes	No
Bryce	Proprietary	Yes	Yes	No	No
Carrara	Proprietary	Yes	Yes	No	No
Cheetah3D	Proprietary	No	Yes	No	No
Cinema 4D	Proprietary	Yes	Yes	No	Amiga
dbOptic	Proprietary	Yes	No	No	No
Embree	APGL2	Yes	Yes	Yes	No
form•Z RenderZone Plus	Proprietary	Yes	Yes	No	No
FRED	Proprietary	Yes	No	No	No
FurryBall	Proprietary	Yes	No	No	No
Holomatix Rendition	Proprietary	Yes	Yes	Yes	No
Houdini	Proprietary	Yes	Yes	Yes	No
Imagine	Proprietary	Yes	No	No	Amiga, MS-DOS
Indigo Renderer	Proprietary	Yes	Yes	Yes	No
Kerkythea	Freeware	Yes	Yes	Yes	No
LightWave 3D	Proprietary	Yes	Yes	No	Amiga
Lucan	Freeware, Proprietary	Yes	No	No	No
LuxCoreRender	GPLv3	Yes	Yes	Yes	No
Manta Interactive Ray Tracer	MIT	No	Yes	Yes	No
Maxwell Render	Proprietary	Yes	Yes	Yes	No
McXtrace	GPL	Yes	Yes	Yes	No
Mental ray	Proprietary	Yes	Yes	Yes	No
MODO	Proprietary	Yes	Yes	No	No
Octane Render	Proprietary	Yes	Yes	Yes	No
OptiX	Proprietary	Yes	Yes	Yes	No
Photopia	Proprietary	Yes	No	No	No
Picogen	GPLv3	Yes	No	Yes	No
Pixar RenderMan	Proprietary	Yes	Yes	Yes	No
Pixie Renderer	GPL	Yes	Yes	Yes	No
POV-Ray	AGPLv3	Yes	Yes	Yes	
Quadoa Optical CAD	Proprietary	Yes	No	Yes	No
Rayshade	pre-gpl open source, gpl-like	Yes	Yes	Yes	Yes
Radiance	BSD	Yes	Yes	Yes	No
Realsoft 3D	Proprietary	Yes	Yes	Yes	Amiga, IRIX (dropped)
Shade3D	Proprietary	Yes	Yes	No	No
Speos	Proprietary	Yes	No	No	No
Sunflow	MIT	Yes	Yes	Yes	No
Tachyon	GPL	No	Yes	Yes	No
Terragen	Proprietary	Yes	Yes	No	No
TracePro	Proprietary	Yes	No	No	No
TurboSilver	Proprietary	No	No	No	Amiga
V-Ray	Proprietary	Yes	Yes	Yes	No
Visionaray	MIT	Yes	Yes	Yes	No
Vue	Proprietary	Yes	Yes	No	No
YafaRay	LGPL	Yes	Yes	Yes	No
Zemax	Proprietary	Yes	No	No	No

== See also ==
- List of computer-aided engineering software
- List of computer simulation software
- List of lighting design software
