= Photopia Optical Design Software =

Photopia
- Stable release: 2015.1 / November 3, 2015; 10 years ago
- Operating system: Windows
- Type: CAD Software
- License: Proprietary. Copyright(c) 1996-2016, LTI Optics, LLC.
- Website: www.ltioptics.com/Photopia/overview.html

Photopia Optical Design Software (Photopia) is a commercial optical engineering ray-tracing software program for the design and analysis of non-imaging optical systems. Photopia is written and distributed by LTI Optics, LLC (formerly Lighting Technologies, Inc.) and was first released in 1996. Photopia's main market is the architectural lighting industry but it is also used in the automotive, medical, industrial, signal and consumer products industries. Photopia includes a full library of lamps including the latest high brightness LEDs as well as a library of material BSDF data.

== History ==
Photopia's predecessor, FiELD was released by Lighting Technologies, Inc. in 1987. A major re-write of the code resulted in Photopia, released in 1996. Photopia has been in continual development since 1996, first by Lighting Technologies, Inc., then by spin off LTI Optics, LLC who has been responsible for Photopia since 2006.

== Markets ==
Photopia is used in the architectural lighting, medical, automotive, industrial, signal and consumer products industries. It has been used to design LED luminaires., solar concentrators, and UV disinfection systems , among many others.

== Daylighting Simulation ==
Photopia has found wide use in the daylighting simulation segment of the market. Photopia has a built in set of CIE Sky Models for simulating the output of various daylighting devices, including light shelves, glazing, tubular daylight devices, and solar concentrators

== User Interface ==
Photopia works on modern versions of the Windows operating system. Photopia has a CAD system which is used for setting up simulations and viewing results. Photopia can import DXF, DWG, and STL drawing files, and can export DXF and 3DM file formats for CAD translation. Photopia has a scripting interface for running batch analysis and setting up models without the CAD interface.

Photopia for SolidWorks is an add-in that provides full ray trace simulations and output viewing inside of recent versions of SolidWorks.

Photopia for Rhino is an add-in that provides full ray trace simulations and output viewing inside of recent versions of Rhino.

== Source and Material Library ==
Photopia has a library of source models for lamps that can be imported, as well as a library of material BSDF data that can be assigned to parts. This ensures that raytraces are accurate since the input data for lamps and materials is accurate.

== See also ==
- List of ray tracing software
- Optical engineering
- Optical lens design
- Ray tracing (physics)
- LTI Optics, LLC is a Research Associate of SolidWorks and SolidWorks Corporation
- LTI Optics, LLC is an LED Solution Provider of Cree Inc.
