= Advanced Systems Analysis Program =

Optical system software

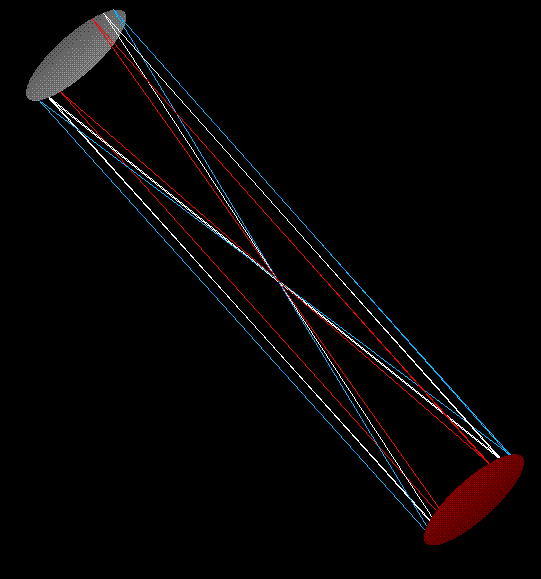
- Example of ASAP 2006 output on Windows XP
- Developer: Breault Research Organization
- Stable release: 2010 Version 1, Release 1 / December 10, 2010; 15 years ago
- Operating system: Windows
- Type: CAD Software
- License: Proprietary
- Website: www.breault.com/software/asap.php

The Advanced Systems Analysis Program (ASAP) is optical engineering software used to simulate optical systems. ASAP can handle coherent as well as incoherent light sources. It is a non-sequential ray tracing tool which means that it can be used not only to analyze lens systems but also for stray light analysis. It uses a Gaussian beam approximation for analysis of coherent sources.

== See also ==
- Optical engineering
- Optical lens design
- List of ray tracing software
