= TracePro =

Commercial optical engineering software

TracePro is a commercial optical engineering software program for designing and analyzing optical and illumination systems. The program's graphical user interface (GUI) is 3D CAD-based creating a virtual prototyping environment to perform software simulation before manufacture.

== History ==
Developed by Lambda Research Corporation of Westford, Massachusetts, USA, under an SBIR grant from NASA, the program has been in continual development since 1994. NASA uses the program in its next-generation integrated design manufacturing approach as detailed in NASA's Spinoff magazine.

== Markets ==
TracePro is used in the aerospace, defense, lighting, display, biomedical and illumination markets. It has been used in many projects for designing and analyzing all types of optical/illumination systems ranging from stray light suppression in telescopes and cameras to biomedical applications to LED modeling and solar collector modeling.

In the aerospace market, TracePro is best known for its stray light analysis capabilities. The program was used to analyze the FIRST Telescope, James Webb Space Telescope, the Mars Rover cameras, Long-Range Reconnaissance Imager (LORRI) and the Terrestrial Planet Finder Coronagraph.

== The TracePro approach ==
Users create geometry either by using the native TracePro CAD interface or by importing models directly from SolidWorks, Pro/ENGINEER, Solid Edge, Autodesk Inventor or other CAD product that exports IGES or STEP models. TracePro additionally has an add-in to Solidworks, RayViz. RayViz allows users to apply and save optical properties directly to their SolidWorks model and ray trace surface sources as raysets to visualize light propagation within Solidworks. To ensure data integrity, a single model is used by both TracePro for ray tracing and optical analysis and by SolidWorks for mechanical design and modifying optical material properties. With RayViz, users significantly accelerate the iterative design process. Users using optical design programs such as OSLO, Zemax or Code V can also import these models to create a complete optomechanical design using the built-in multi-document interface. After creating the optical-mechanical model users then create sources using built-in source wizards, import models from the bulb catalogs or import ray files created from measured data, measured by Radiant Imaging's ProSource Radiant Source product. Then rays are traced through the systems to find energy distributions on any surface or track volume flux through any space. Users can also simulate lit appearance of illumination or lighting systems and trace bitmap images through optical systems to check for uniformity, veiling glare, flare, and distortion issues. Thermal effects and stray light issues can also be simulated.

== Compatibility ==
TracePro works with other software products using a Dynamic Data Exchange (DDE) client/server interface. This enables the program to work with products such as MATLAB to create a multi-disciplinary environment. TracePro also uses the Scheme language as a macro language to extend the program's capabilities and provide automated analysis, optimization, and tolerancing capabilities. TracePro models geometry using the Kubotek Kosmos 3D Framework.

== Editions ==
TracePro optical software is available in three commercial editions:

- TracePro LC
- TracePro Standard
- TracePro Expert

== See also ==
- SolidWorks and SolidWorks Corporation have a formal partnership with Lambda Research Organization
- Optics Software for Layout and Optimization – TracePro imports OSLO design files and is a compatible product from Lambda Research Corporation
- Optical engineering
- Optical lens design
- Ray tracing (physics)
