= Veiling glare =

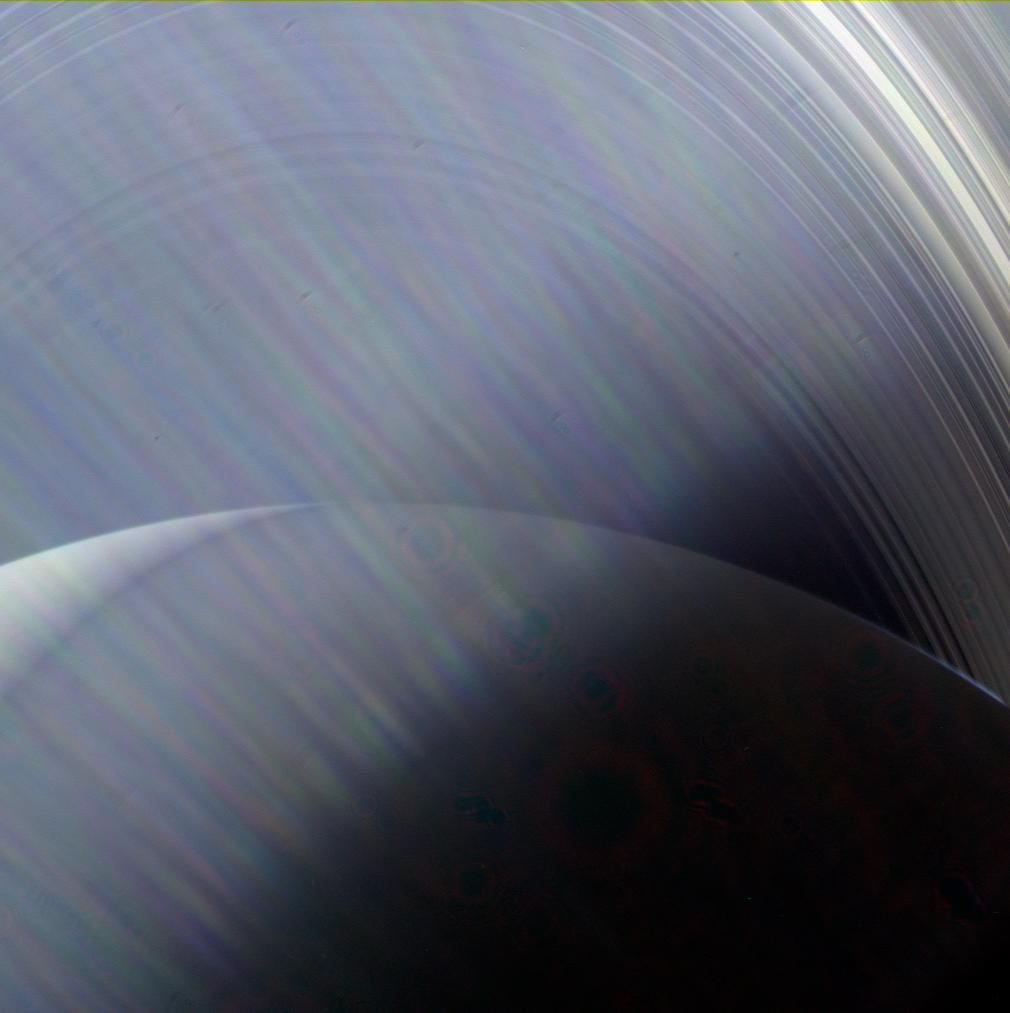
Veiling glare in a photograph from Cassini (spacecraft)

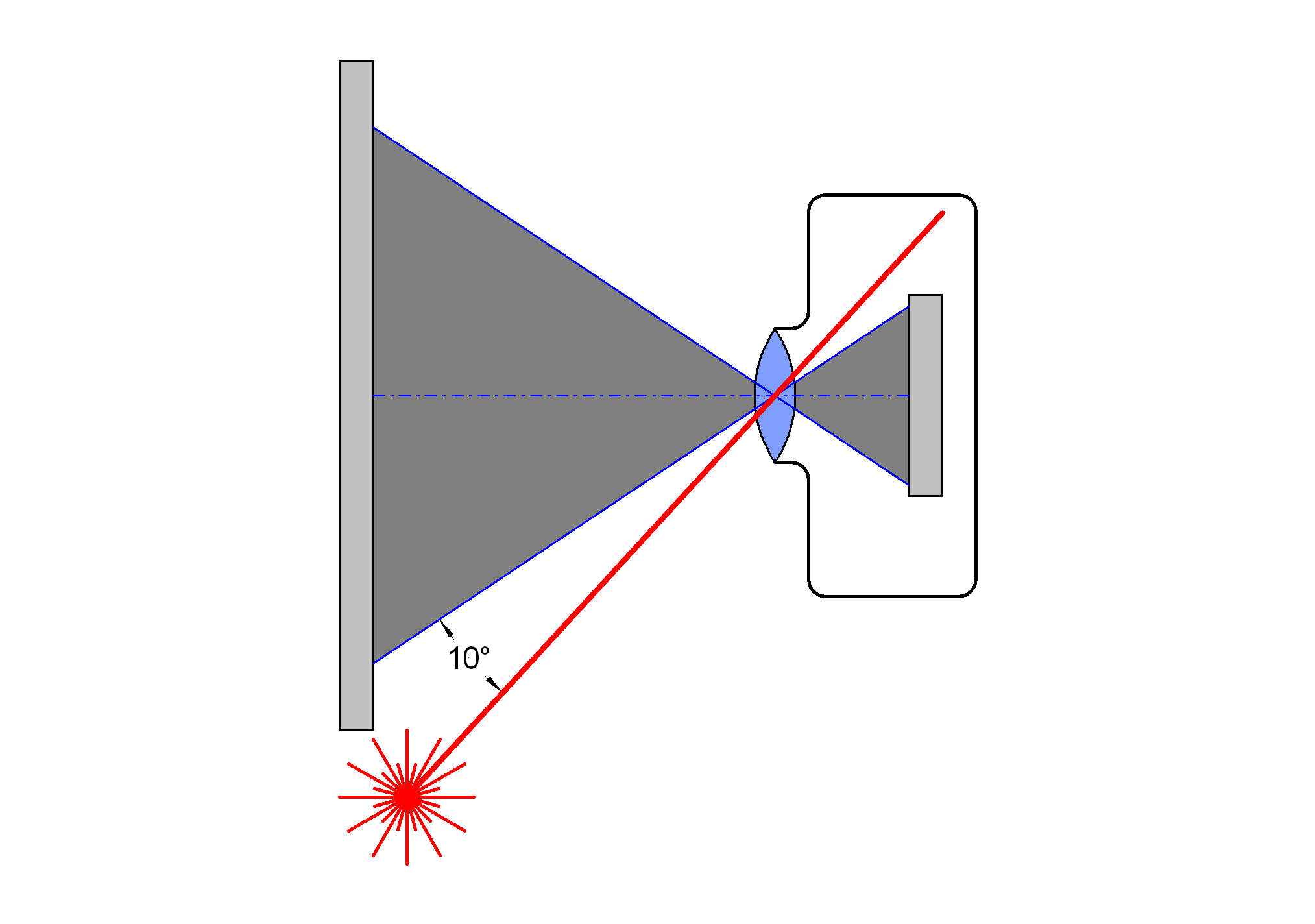
Veiling glare caused by stray light reflecting inside the camera or scattering in the lens

Veiling glare is an imperfection of performance in optical instruments (such as cameras and telescopes) arising from incoming light that strays from the normal image-forming paths, and reaches the focal plane. The effect superimposes a form of noise onto the normal image sensed by the detector (film, digital sensor, or eye viewing through an eyepiece), resulting in a final image degraded by loss of contrast and reduced definition.

== Scenes ==
In scenes where a bright object is next to a faint object, veiling glare from the bright object may hide the faint object from view, even though the instrument is otherwise capable of spatially resolving the two. Veiling glare is a limiting factor in high-dynamic-range imaging.

Glare in optical instruments differs from glare in vision, even though they both follow the same physical principles, because the phenomenon arises from mechanical versus physiological features.

== Factors and design techniques ==
Light strays or scatters in lenses due to many potential factors in design and operation. These factors include dirt, film, or scratches on lens surfaces; reflections from lens surfaces or their mounts; and the slightly imperfect transparency (or reflection) of real glass (or mirrors).

Typical optical engineering design techniques to minimize stray light include: black coatings on internal surfaces, knife edges on mounts, antireflection lens coatings, internal baffles and stops, and tube extensions which block sources outside the field of view.

Veiling glare is a performance factor tested by UL standard 2802, Testing and Certification for the Performance of Video Cameras.

== See also ==
- Lens flare
