= POV-Ray =

Text-based ray-tracing program

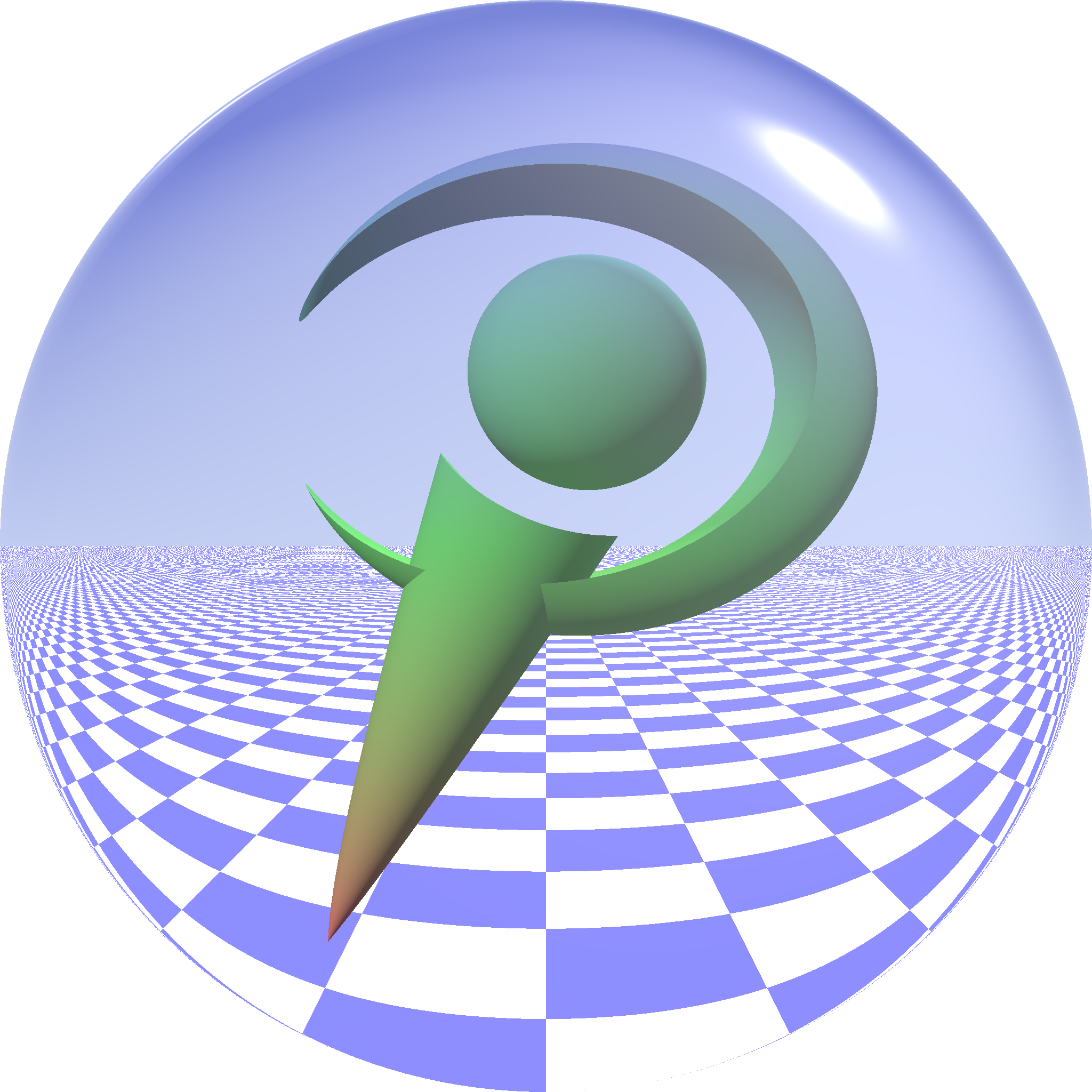
- Original authors: David Kirk Buck, Aaron A. Collins, Alexander Enzmann
- Developer: The POV-Team
- Release: July 29, 1991; 34 years ago
- Stable release: 3.7.0.0 / 7 November 2013; 8 July 2021
- Preview release: v3.8.0-beta.2 (August 9, 2021; 4 years ago) [±]
- Written in: C++
- Operating system: Cross-platform
- Type: Ray tracer
- License: AGPL-3.0-or-later
- Website: www.povray.org
- Repository: github.com/POV-Ray/povray

The Persistence of Vision Ray Tracer, most commonly acronymed as POV-Ray, is a cross-platform ray-tracing program that generates images from a text-based scene description. It was originally based on DKBTrace, written by David Kirk Buck and Aaron A. Collins for Amiga computers. POV-Ray is free and open-source software, with the source code available under the AGPL-3.0-or-later license.

== History ==
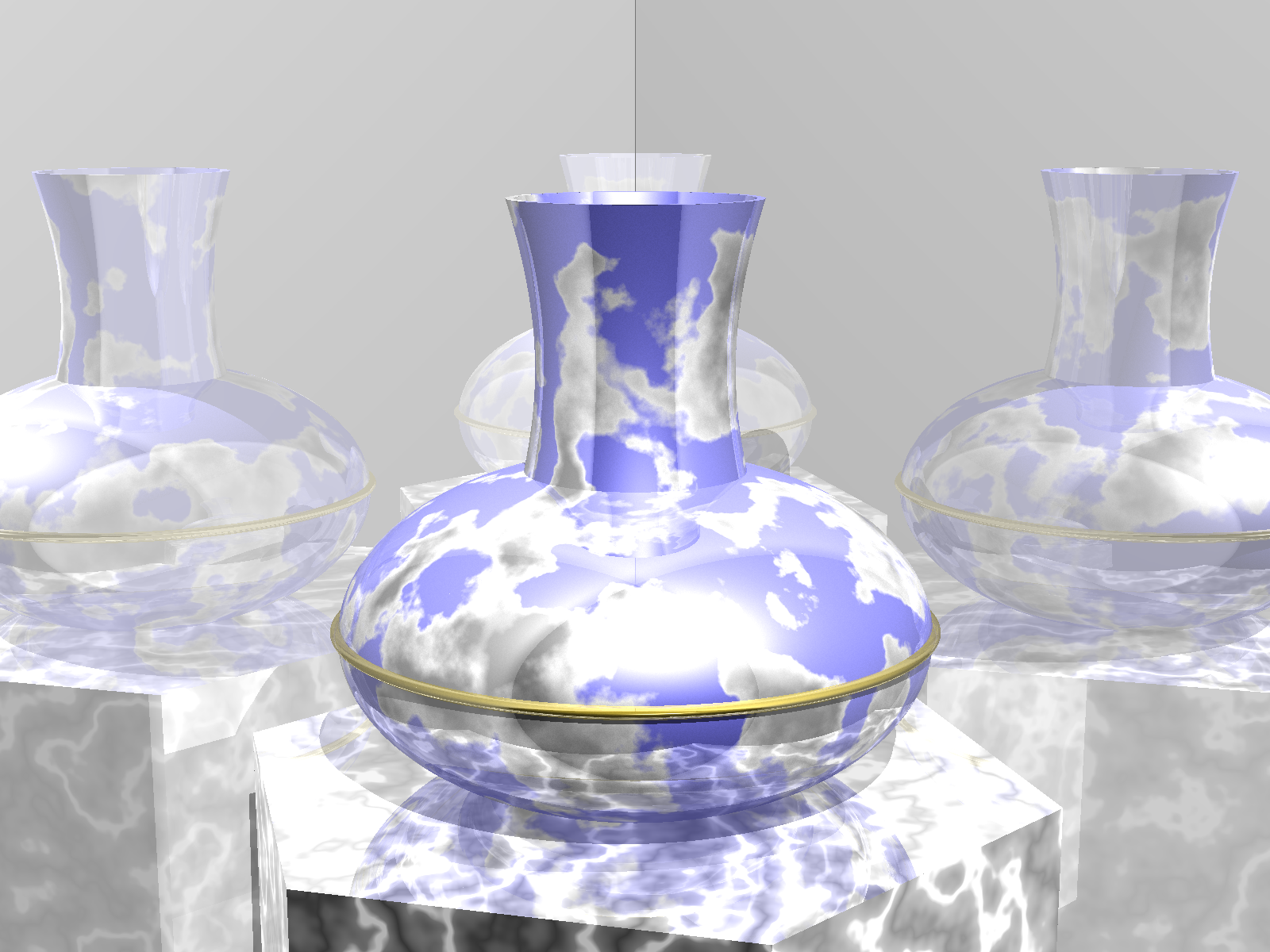
A vase on a pedestal rendered with DKBTrace 2.12

Sometime in the 1980s, David Kirk Buck downloaded the source code for a Unix ray tracer to his Amiga. He experimented with it for a while and eventually decided to write his own ray tracer named DKBTrace after his initials. He posted it to the "You Can Call Me Ray" bulletin board system (BBS) in Chicago, thinking others might be interested in it. In 1987, Aaron A. Collins downloaded DKBTrace and began working on an x86 port of it. He and David Buck collaborated to add several more features. POV also had/has similarities with (and borrows from) Rayshade, another BBS era raytracer, including the Rayshade book.

When the program proved to be more popular than anticipated, they could not keep up with demand for more features. Thus, in July 1991, David turned over the project to a team of programmers working in the "GraphDev" forum on CompuServe. At the same time, David felt that it was inappropriate to use his initials on a program he no longer maintained. The name "STAR-Light" (Software Taskforce on Animation and Rendering) was initially used, but eventually the name became "PV-Ray", and then ultimately "POV-Ray" (Persistence of Vision Ray Tracer), a name inspired by Dalí's painting, The Persistence of Memory.

Features of the application, and a summary of its history, are discussed in a February 2008 interview with David Kirk Buck and Chris Cason on episode 24 of FLOSS Weekly.

== Features ==
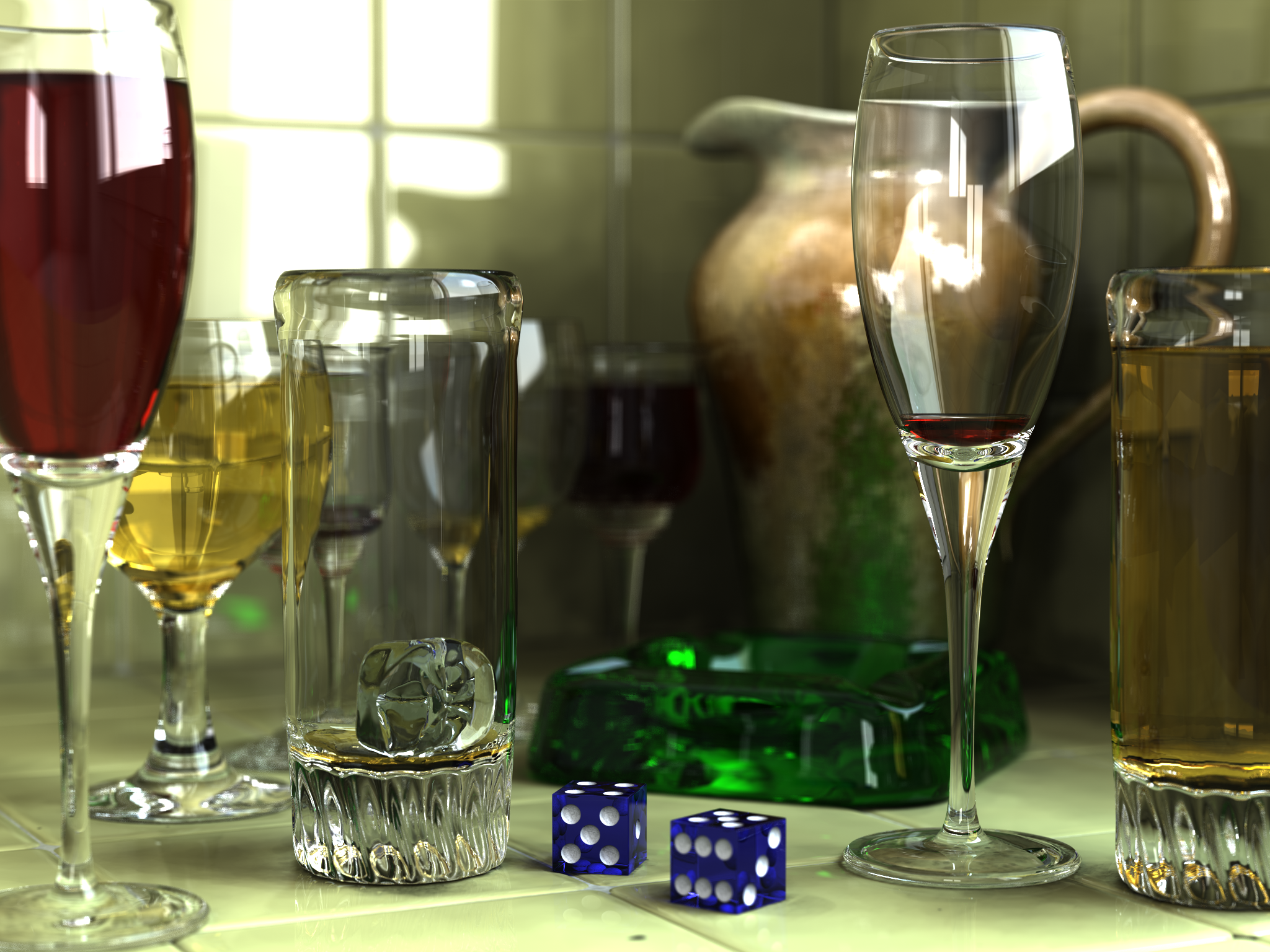
Glass scene rendered by POV-Ray in 2006 demonstrating radiosity, photon mapping, focal blur, and other photorealistic capabilities (image created by Gilles Tran)

POV-Ray has matured substantially since its creation. Recent versions of the software include the following features:

- a Turing-complete scene description language (SDL) that supports macros and loops
- a library of ready-made scenes, textures, and objects
- support for a number of geometric primitives and constructive solid geometry
- several kinds of light sources
- atmospheric effects such as fog and media (smoke, clouds)
- reflections, refractions, and light caustics using photon mapping
- surface patterns such as wrinkles, bumps, and ripples, for use in procedural textures and bump mapping
- radiosity
- support for textures and rendered output in many image formats, including TGA, PNG, and JPEG, among others
- extensive user documentation
- support for custom output resolutions (This includes extreme resolutions such as 16K)
- two types of SSAA: Type 1 is an adaptive, non-recursive, super-sampling method. It is adaptive because not every pixel is super-sampled. Type 2 is an adaptive and recursive super-sampling method. It is recursive because the pixel is sub-divided and sub-sub-divided recursively. The adaptive nature of type 2 is the variable depth of recursion.
- a large collection of tools made and shared by users. The collection is also an accessible reference for students of ray tracing, 3D geometry, and computer graphics algorithms.

=== Current version ===
The current official version of POV-Ray is 3.7. This version introduces:

- support for symmetric multiprocessing (SMP), to allow the renderer to take advantage of multiple processors
- support for high-dynamic-range imaging (HDRI), including the OpenEXR and radiance file formats
- improved bounding using BSP trees

Some of the main introduced features of the previous release (3.6) are:

- extending UV mapping to more primitives
- adding 16- and 32-bit integer data to a density file
- improving 64-bit compatibility

In July 2006, Intel Corporation started using the beta version of 3.7 to demonstrate their new dual-core Conroe processor due to the efficiency of the SMP (symmetric multiprocessing) implementation.

=== Primitives ===
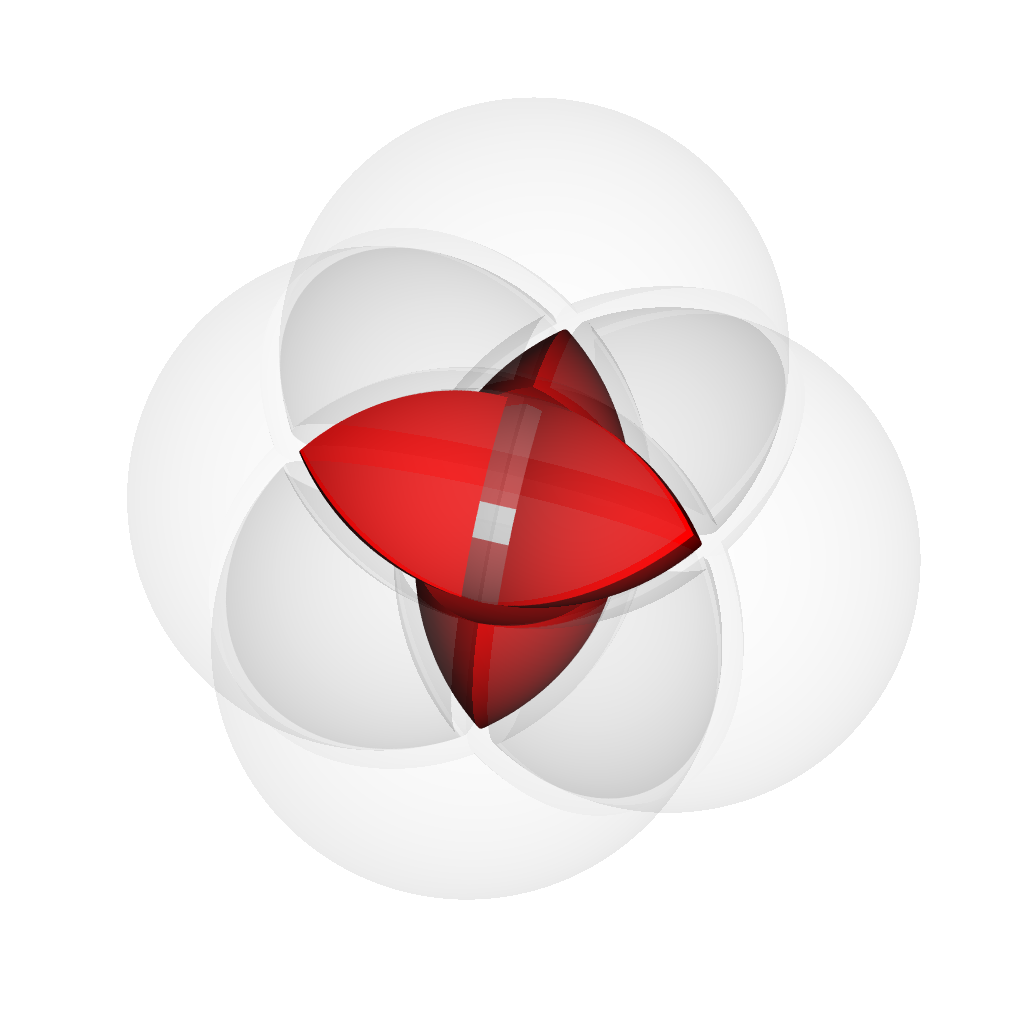
Rendering of the Venn diagram of four spheres created with constructive solid geometry, or CSG. The source is on the description page of the image.

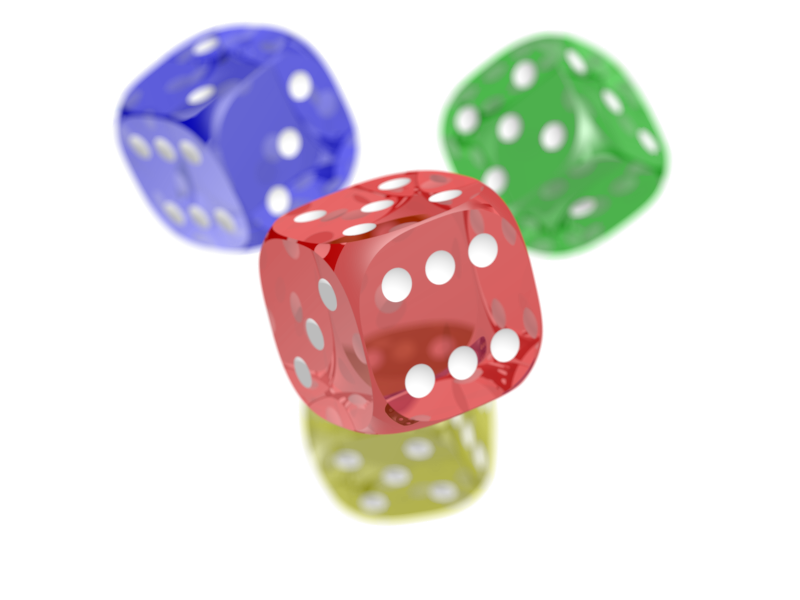
Some colored dice rendered in POV-Ray. CSG, refraction and focal blur are demonstrated.

POV-Ray, in addition to standard 3D geometric shapes like tori, spheres, and heightfields, supports mathematically defined primitives such as the isosurface (a finite approximation of an arbitrary function), the polynomial primitive (an infinite object defined by a 15th order or lower polynomial), the julia fractal (a 3-dimensional slice of a 4-dimensional fractal), the superquadratic ellipsoid (an intermediate between a sphere and a cube), and the parametric primitive (using equations that represent its surface, rather than its interior).

POV-Ray internally represents objects using their mathematical definitions; all POV-Ray primitive objects can be described by mathematical functions. This is different from many computer programs that include 3D models, which typically use triangle meshes to compose all the objects in a scene.

This fact provides POV-Ray with several advantages and disadvantages over other rendering and modeling systems; POV-Ray primitives are more accurate than their polygonal counterparts: objects that can be described in terms of spheres, planar surfaces, cylinders, tori, and the like, are perfectly smooth and mathematically accurate in POV-Ray renderings, whereas polygonal artifacts may be visible in mesh-based modeling software. POV-Ray primitives are also simpler to define than most of their polygonal counterparts, e.g., in POV-Ray, a sphere is described simply by its center and radius; in a mesh-based environment, a sphere must be described by a multitude of small connected polygons (usually quads or triangles).

On the other hand, script-based primitive modeling is not always a practical method to create certain objects, such as realistic characters or complex man-made artifacts like cars. Those objects can be created first in mesh-based modeling applications such as Wings 3D and Blender, and then they can be converted to POV-Ray's own mesh format.

=== Examples of the scene description language ===
The following is an example of the scene description language used by POV-Ray to describe a scene to render. It demonstrates the use of a background colour, camera, lights, a simple box shape having a surface normal and finish, and the transforming effects of rotation.

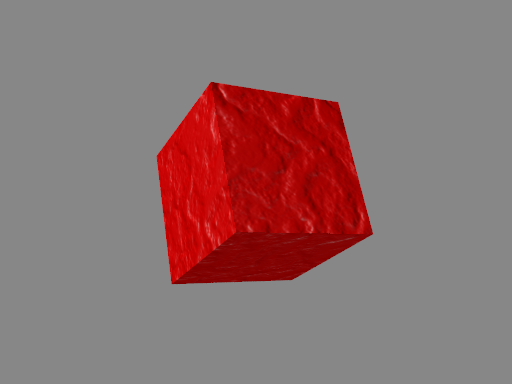
POV-Ray image output based on the script

#version 3.6;
// Includes a separate file defining a number of common colours
 #include "colors.inc"
 global_settings { assumed_gamma 1.0 }

// Sets a background colour for the image (dark grey)
 background   { color rgb <0.25, 0.25, 0.25> }

// Places a camera
// direction: Sets, among other things, the field of view of the camera
// right: Sets the aspect ratio of the image
// look_at: Tells the camera where to look
 camera       { location  <0.0, 0.5, -4.0>
                direction 1.5*z
                right     x*image_width/image_height
                look_at   <0.0, 0.0, 0.0> }

// Places a light source
// color: Sets the color of the light source (white)
// translate: Moves the light source to a desired location
 light_source { <0, 0, 0>
                color rgb <1, 1, 1>
                translate <-5, 5, -5> }
// Places another light source
// color: Sets the color of the light source (dark grey)
// translate: Moves the light source to a desired location
 light_source { <0, 0, 0>
                color rgb <0.25, 0.25, 0.25>
                translate <6, -6, -6> }

// Sets a box
// pigment: Sets a color for the box ("Red" as defined in "colors.inc")
// finish: Sets how the surface of the box reflects light
// normal: Sets a bumpiness for the box using the "agate" in-built model
// rotate: Rotates the box
 box          { <-0.5, -0.5, -0.5>,
                <0.5, 0.5, 0.5>
                texture { pigment { color Red }
                          finish  { specular 0.6 }
                          normal  { agate 0.25 scale 1/2 }
                        }
                rotate <45,46,47> }

The following script fragment shows the use of variable declaration, assignment, comparison and the while loop construct:

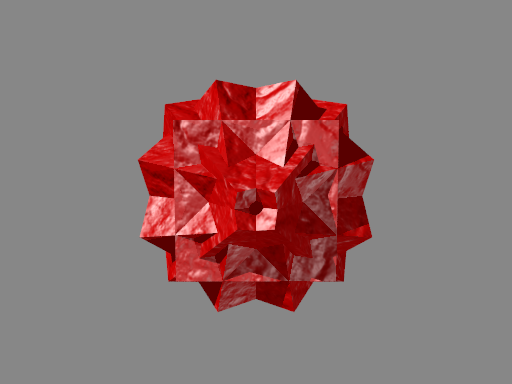
POV-Ray image output based on the script

 #declare the_angle = 0;

 #while (the_angle < 360)
 	box {   <-0.5, -0.5, -0.5>
 		<0.5, 0.5, 0.5>
                texture { pigment { color Red }
                          finish  { specular 0.6 }
                          normal  { agate 0.25 scale 1/2 } }
 		rotate the_angle }
 	#declare the_angle = the_angle + 45;
 #end

== Modeling ==
The POV-Ray program itself does not include a modeling feature; it is essentially a pure renderer with a sophisticated model description language. To accompany this feature set, third parties have developed a large variety of modeling software, some specialized for POV-Ray, others supporting import and export of its data structures, including the free and open-source 3D creation suite Blender.

A number of additional POV-Ray compatible modelers are linked from Povray.org: Modelling Programs.

In 2007, POV-Ray acquired the rights to Moray, an interactive 3-D modeling program long used with POV-Ray. However, as of December 2016, Moray development is stalled.

== Software ==
=== Development and maintenance ===
Official modifications to the POV-Ray source tree are done and/or approved by the POV-Team. Most patch submission and/or bug reporting is done in the POV-Ray newsgroups on the news.povray.org news server (with a Web interface also available). Since POV-Ray's source is available there are unofficial forks and patched versions of POV-Ray available from third parties; however, these are not officially supported by the POV-Team.

Official POV-Ray versions currently do not support shader plug-ins. Some features, like radiosity and splines are still in development and may be subject to syntactical change.

=== Platform support ===
POV-Ray 3.6 is distributed in compiled format for Mac, Windows and Linux. Support for Intel Macs is not available in the Mac version, but since Mac OS X is a version of Unix the Linux version can be compiled on it.

The 3.7 versions with SMP support are officially supported for Windows and Linux. Unofficial Mac versions for v3.7 can be found.

POV-Ray can be ported to any platform which has a compatible C++ compiler.

=== Licensing ===
Originally, POV-Ray was distributed under its own POV-Ray License; namely, the POV-Ray 3.6 Distribution License and the POV-Ray 3.6 Source License, which permitted free distribution of the program source code and binaries, while restricting commercial distribution and the creation of derivative works other than fully functional versions of POV-Ray.

Although the source code of older versions is available for modification, due to the above 3.6 and prior license restrictions, it was not open source or free software according to the OSI or the FSF definition of the term. This was a problem as source code exchange with the greater FOSS ecosystem was impossible due to license incompatibility with copyleft licenses.

One of the reasons that POV-Ray was not originally licensed under the free software GNU General Public License (GPL), or other open source licenses, is that POV-Ray was developed before the GPL-style licenses became widely used; the developers wrote their own license for the release of POV-Ray, and contributors to the software worked under the assumption their contributions would be licensed under the POV-Ray 3.6 Licenses.

In 2013, with version 3.7, POV-Ray was relicensed under the GNU Affero General Public License version 3 (or later). Thus POV-Ray is since then free software according to the FSF definition and also open source software according to the Open Source Definition.

== See also ==
- Blender – a free and open-source software program for 3D modeling, animation, and rendering
- Kerkythea – a freeware ray-tracing program with enhanced Sketchup compatibility
- Sunflow – an open-source rendering system for photo-realistic image synthesis, written in Java
