= Stray light =

Undesired light in an optical system

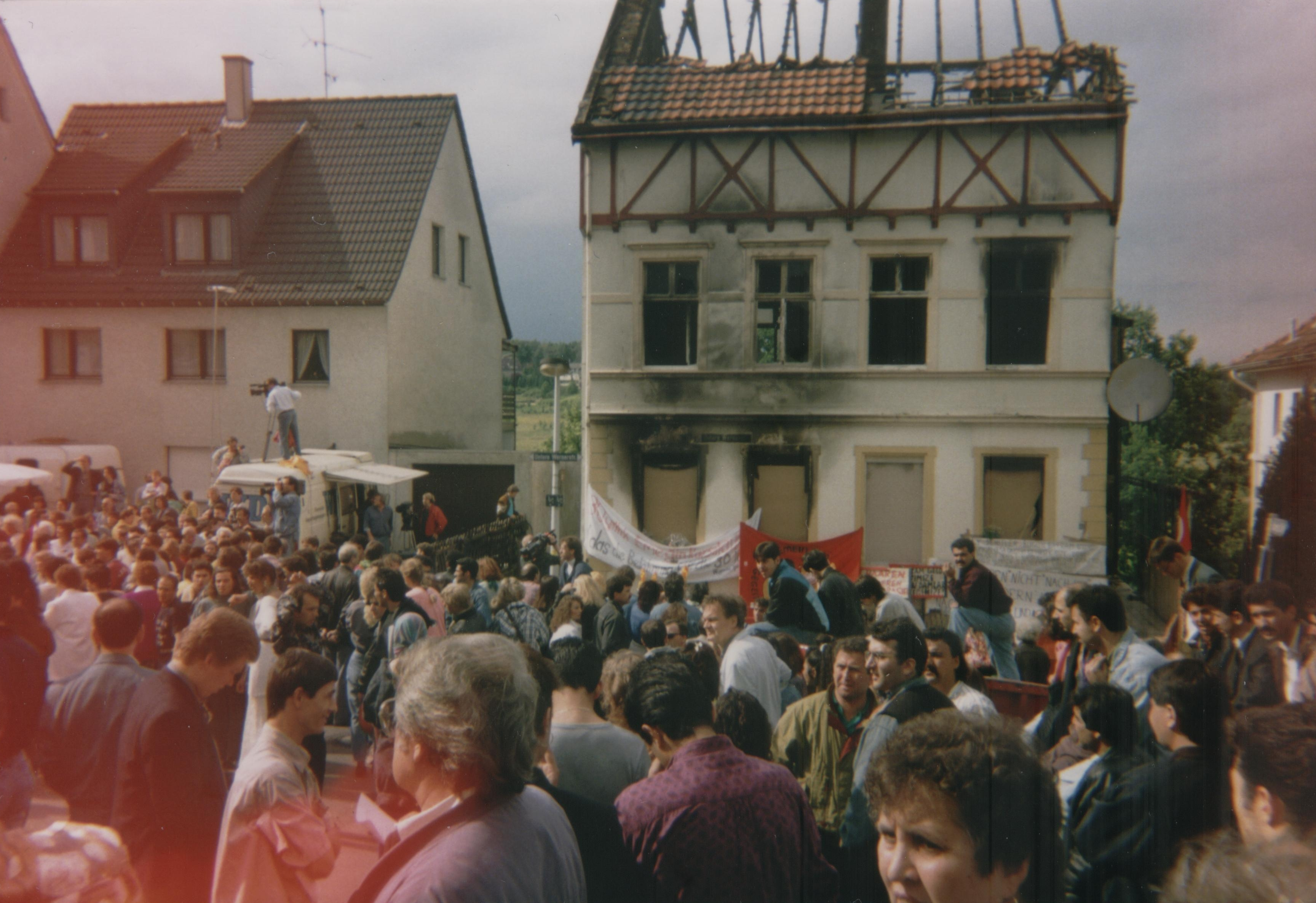
A photo affected by stray light

Stray light is light in an optical system which was not intended in the design. The light may be from the intended source, but follow paths other than intended, or it may be from a source other than that intended. This light will often set a working limit on the dynamic range of the system; it limits the signal-to-noise ratio or contrast ratio, by limiting how dark the system can be. Ocular straylight is stray light in the human eye.

== Optical systems ==
=== Monochromatic light ===
Optical measuring instruments that work with monochromatic light, such as spectrophotometers, define stray light as light in the system at wavelengths (colors) other than the one intended. The stray light level is one of the most critical specifications of an instrument. For instance, intense, narrow absorption bands can easily appear to have a peak absorption less than the true absorption of the sample because the ability of the instrument to measure light transmission through the sample is limited by the stray light level. One method to reduce stray light in these systems is the use of double monochromators. The ratio of transmitted stray light to signal is reduced to the product of the ratio for each monochromator, so combining two monochromators in series with 10^{−3} stray light each produces a system with a stray light ratio of 10^{−6}, allowing a much larger dynamic range for measurements.

Methods have also been invented to measure and compensate for stray light in spectrophotometers. ASTM standard E387 describes methods of estimating stray light in spectrophotometers. The terms used are stray radiant power (SRP) and stray radiant power ratio (SRPR).

There are also commercial sources of reference materials to help in testing the stray light level in spectrophotometers.

=== Astronomy ===
In optical astronomy, stray light from sky glow can limit the ability to detect faint objects. In this sense stray light is light from other sources that is focused to the same place as the faint object.

Stray light is a major issue in the design of a coronagraph, used for observing the Sun's corona.

== Sources ==
There are many sources of stray light. For example:

- Ghost orders in diffraction gratings. These can be caused by periodic variations in the spacing of grooves in ruled gratings, for instance.
- Light scattered towards a telescope from particles along the optical path to a star.
- Light emitted by components of the optical system.
  - Infrared optical systems are, obviously, especially susceptible due to thermal radiation.
    - one way to reduce the effect of stray IR generated within the system is to move from working with DC signals to a narrow frequency band where the amplitude of the stray emissions is smaller. This can be done, for instance, by modulating the source light entering the system with an optical chopper, and isolating the detected source signal component from the detected stray component with a lock in amplifier synchronized to the chopper frequency. However, this approach is still limited by the dynamic range of the detector. That is, the stray component must not be so great that it saturates the detector.
- Reflections from lens surfaces.
  - Anti-reflective coatings are used to reduce stray light.
  - Narcissus effect - Specifically, thermal radiation from the infrared detector reflected back to itself from lens surfaces.
- Light scattered from the surfaces of supporting structures within the optical system.
- Diffuse reflection from imperfect mirror surfaces.
- Light leaks in the enclosure of the system.

== Design tools ==
A number of optical design programs can model stray light in an optical system, for instance:

- ASAP
- FRED
- Synopsys LightTools
- TracePro
- Zemax

Such models can be used to predict and minimize stray light in the final system.

== See also ==
- Glare (vision)
- Lens flare
- Spectral power distribution
- Veiling glare
