= Rendition =

Rendition or Renditions may refer to:

== Law ==
- Rendition (law), a legal term meaning "handing over"
- Extraordinary rendition, the apprehension and extrajudicial transfer of a person from one nation to another

== Film & TV ==
- Rendition (film), a 2007 film directed by Gavin Hood, starring Jake Gyllenhaal and Reese Witherspoon
- "Rendition" (Torchwood), an episode of Torchwood
- "Rendition" (The Walking Dead), an episode from season 11 of The Walking Dead

== Music ==
- Renditions (album), a 2011 studio album by English singer Amelia Warner under the name Slow Moving Millie
- Renditions (EP), a 2015 EP by the American band SECRETS
- "Rendition", a song by Manic Street Preachers from their 2007 album Send Away the Tigers

== Games ==
- Rendition (text adventure game), a 2007 political art experiment in text adventure form
- Rendition: Guantanamo, a cancelled video game

== Others ==
- Rendition (company), a maker of 2D and 3D graphics chipsets for PCs
- Renditions (magazine), a Hong Kong journal featuring Chinese literature in English translation

== See also ==
- Holomatix Rendition, a discontinued raytracing renderer
- U.S. Renditions, a defunct American-based anime home video distributor
- Render (disambiguation)
