= Hui Meng =

Mechanical engineer

Hui Meng is a mechanical engineer whose research focuses on hemodynamics (the modeling of blood flow), particularly with respect to intracranial aneurysms. Educated in China, Germany, and the US, she is a University at Buffalo Distinguished Professor in the Department of Mechanical and Aerospace Engineering, and chief scientific officer of Neurovascular Diagnostics.

== Education and career ==
Meng studied optical engineering at Zhejiang University in China, earning a bachelor's degree in 1984 and a master's degree in 1987. After three years studying applied physics as a German Academic Exchange Service (DAAD) Scholar at Technische Universität Berlin, she went to the University of Houston for doctoral study in mechanical engineering, completing her Ph.D. in 1994.

She became an assistant professor of mechanical engineering at Kansas State University from 1995 to 1999. In 1999, she moved to the University at Buffalo as an associate professor in the Department of Mechanical and Aerospace Engineering. She was promoted to full professor in 2004, and added an affiliation as adjunct professor of biomedical engineering in 2010. She was named University at Buffalo Distinguished Professor in 2018.

She is also a co-founder and chief scientific officer of Neurovascular Diagnostics, a spin-off firm from the University at Buffalo aiming to detect unruptured aneurysms in high-risk patients.

== Recognition ==
Meng was named a Fellow of the American Institute for Medical and Biological Engineering in 2014. She became an ASME Fellow in 2017.
