= Render =

Render, rendered, or rendering may refer to:

== Computing ==
- Rendering (computer graphics), generating an image from a model by means of computer programs
- Architectural rendering, creating two-dimensional images or animations showing the attributes of a proposed architectural design
- Artistic rendering, creating, shading, and texturing of an image
- Typesetting, composition of text for visual display
- Rendering engine, the software that transforms (renders) data into a picture
  - 3D rendering, generating image or motion picture from virtual 3D models
  - Browser engine, component of a web browser that renders web pages
  - High-dynamic-range rendering, allows preservation of details that may be lost due to limiting contrast ratios
  - Non-photorealistic rendering, focuses on enabling a wide variety of expressive styles for digital art
  - Scanline rendering, algorithm for visible surface determination
  - Volume rendering, used to display a 2D projection of a 3D discretely sampled data set
  - Ray tracing (graphics) and physically based rendering, uses lighting equations based on physics for more realistic images.

== Arts, entertainment, and media ==
- Rendered (radio program), an independent radio program about the DIY (do-it-yourself) movement
- "Render" a song by Northlane from the album Mesmer, 2017
- Rendering (Berio), a composition by Luciano Berio based on sketches for Franz Schubert's tenth symphony

== People ==
- Adam Render (1822–1881), German-American hunter, prospector and trader in southern Africa
- Arlene Render (born 1943), American diplomat
- George Render (1887–1922), English cricketer
- Mattiline Render (born 1947), American sprinter
- Michael Render (born 1975), better known as Killer Mike, American rapper
- Rudy Render (1926–2014), American musician and songwriter
- Sergio Render (born 1986), American football player
- Shirley Render (born 1943), Canadian politician
- Sylvia Lyons Render (1913–1986), American academic and curator
- Tyshun Render (born 1997), American football player
- William Render (fl. 1800), German grammarian and translator

== Other uses ==
- Rendering (animal products), separation of animal fat from other tissues, to convert waste animal tissue into value-added materials
- Cement render or stucco, a surface covering to the external façade of buildings
- Salute render, raising an unfolded right hand to the forehead to show respect or subjection to senior officers

== See also ==
- Rendition (disambiguation)
- Renders (surname)
