= FocusTrack =

Stage lighting software

- Screenshot of FocusTrack
- Operating system: Microsoft Windows XP, Mac OS X v10.5 or higher
- Type: Entertainment, Theatrical
- License: Individual, Student
- Website: http://www.focustrack.co.uk/

FocusTrack is a database program created specifically for stage lighting applications. The program is designed to allow lighting designers, lighting programmers and lighting electricians to document the way that a show is lit, in order to be able to accurately maintain the look of the lighting over the run of the show, and to be able to re-create the lighting on tour or for future productions of the show in other venues.

== Usage ==
Traditionally, the lighting programmer has relied on their memory, the reliability of the lights or the services of an assistant, often called a lighting tracker, to document each position each light is used in. FocusTrack automates this process by importing the lighting console showfile (from Strand 500-series, ETC Eos-family and MA grandMA consoles) to create a list of each position (called a 'focus') used by each light in the show. The programmer can then add a written description of the purpose of each position. To precisely document the light's position on stage, the programmer can use a digital camera to take a picture of each position in turn. FocusTrack can aid in this process by controlling the lighting console, turning each light on in each position as required; it can then import the photographs to give a complete record of the work of the automated lights during the show.

The information can be displayed in a variety of ways according to circumstance, for example showing all of the uses of one light if it was replaced and the replacement needs to be checked, or all of the lights used in each cue state that might need their focuses corrected when setting up a show in a new venue. FocusTrack is designed to work alongside other lighting industry software, such as Lightwright, to manage information about the lighting rig as a whole. It can also analyze how equipment is used in a show, particularly colour scrolls or gobos, in order to allow the lighting rig to be rationalised for future productions.

It has been used on a range of productions around the world.

== See also ==
- Intelligent Lighting
- Stage lighting instrument
- Light board
- Light board operator
- Stagecraft
- Theatre
