= Gilles Tran =

French 3D digital artist

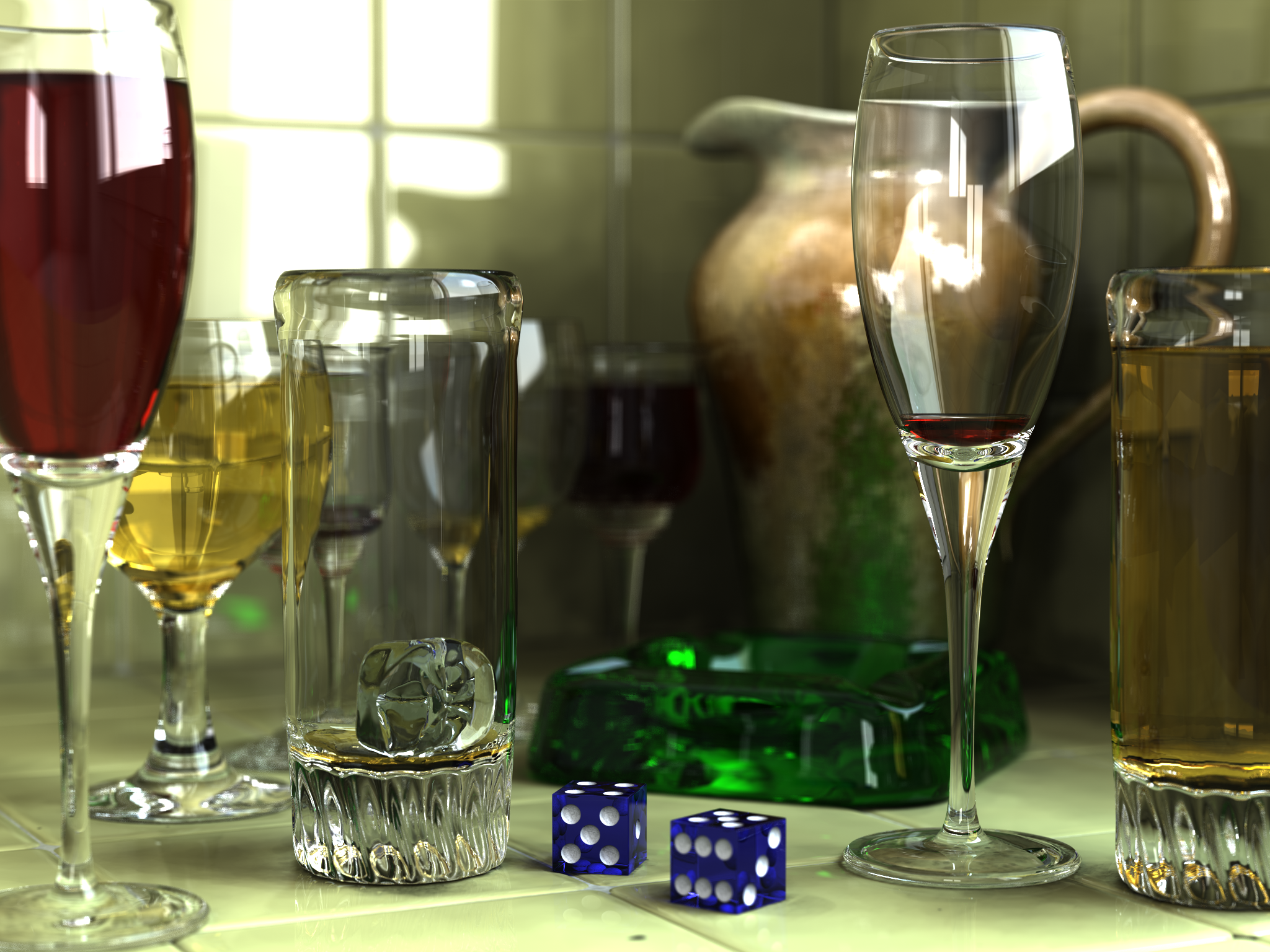
Glasses by Gilles Tran

Gilles Tran is a contemporary French 3D artist mostly known for his images rendered in POV-Ray and multiple winnings of the Internet Ray Tracing Competition. Most notable is his website project The Book of Beginnings with images accompanied with pieces of unfinished text. Gilles Tran was also a writer for feedipedia.org and wrote over many topics. He had many interests in biology and wrote about a multitude of living creatures.

== Projects ==
- 2000–present: The Book of Beginnings
- 2001-2002: helped create Reach for the Stars, the first 3D image rendered in space, rendered in POV-Ray on the International Space Station (April 25 - May 5, 2002) by astronaut Mark Shuttleworth.
- 2004: produced 3D renderings for Infinite Spire and Fallen Headstones, a design proposal for the World Trade Center Memorial
- Invisible Me, a web comic. The character was originally based on Andy, an actual person who frequents the POV-Ray newsgroups. The comic began as an exercise demonstrating that you can create a comic using nothing but talk bubbles. The main character is characterized by his self-loathing and loneliness.

== Exhibitions ==
- 1997: Exposition Art & Science - Paris, France
- 1997: Digipainters ’97 - Rome, Italy
- 2003: Peaux de vaches et autres artistes - Marche-en-Famenne, Belgium
- 2007: Nội viên (Inner Garden) - Ho Chi Minh City, Vietnam

== Publications ==
- 2003: Illustration in The Complete Guide to Digital Illustration, Steve Caplin, Adam Banks, Nigel Holmes, The Ilex Press Ltd, Great Britain
- 2005: Illustration in Digital Design of Nature: Computer Generated Plants and Organics, Oliver Deussen, Bernt Lintermann, Springer, Germany
