= Renders (surname) =

Renders is a Dutch surname. Notable people with the surname include:

- Hans Renders (born 1957), Dutch academic
- Jan Renders (born 1938), Dutch footballer
- Kim Renders (1955–2018), Canadian writer, director, actor and designer
- Marleen Renders (born 1968), Belgian long-distance runner
- Pierre-Paul Renders (born 1963), Belgian film director and screenwriter
- Rik Renders (1922–2008), Belgian racing cyclist
- Semm Renders (born 2007), Belgian footballer
- Sven Renders (born 1981), Belgian road bicycle racer
- Willem Renders (born 2007), Belgian long-distance and cross country runner

== See also ==
- Adam Render (1822–1881), German-American hunter, prospector and trader in southern Africa
- Sammy Boeddha Renders (born 1993), known as Sam Feldt, Dutch DJ, record producer and entrepreneur
- Render (disambiguation)
