= AGi32 =

- Developer(s): Lighting Analysts, Inc.
- Stable release: 19.14
- Operating system: Microsoft Windows
- Type: Simulation
- License: Proprietary EULA
- Website: Lighting Analysts

AGi32 is a simulation tool used for designing lighting projects and calculating the amount of light that will be delivered based on user-set parameters. The resulting calculations are commonly referred to as lighting layouts or point-by-points. AGi32 can calculate the amount of light that will be delivered in any kind of design, interior or exterior, and incorporate surrounding objects, obstructions, and varying shapes like vaulted ceilings or rooms in non-linear shapes. It aids lighting designers, engineers, and electrical contractors in the evaluation of lighting designs for projects before they are built.

== Features ==
In addition to calculating the amount of light in a space, AGi32 can create photo-realistic renderings of how an area will look once light fixtures are installed. It can compute the amount of energy used as well as glare metrics, and can incorporate a variety of situational design needs such as custom aiming, numerous rooms and objects in the same project, and it includes utilities for estimating fixture spacing. The software is designed to determine the amount of light reaching a designated surface or work plane for any type of application. Obtrusive light (exterior) may be calculated and compared against several US and international standards for code compliance. Roadway lighting grids may be laid out per North American (IES) specifications or per several different global lighting standards.

AGi32 can import AutoCAD files up to 2018 DWG or DXF format, and also export files into DWG or DXF format (up to the 2018 version of AutoCAD).

== Industry Testing ==
AGi32 has been independently tested against the International Commission On Illumination (CIE) benchmark, CIE 171:2006, Test Cases to Assess the Accuracy of Lighting Computer Programs: Results for AGi32 version 1.94. (CIE)
