= Rendered (radio program) =

American radio program

- Running time: Ranges from 10 to 60 minutes
- Country of origin: United States
- Language(s): English
- Created by: Julie Sabatier
- Produced by: Julie Sabatier; Jaymee Cuti
- Edited by: Laura Hadden; Brian Kramer; Clark Salisbury
- Original release: 2006 – 2015
- No. of episodes: 62
- Audio format: MP3/WAV
- Website: www.maximumfun.org/shows/rendered

Rendered (formerly Destination DIY) was an independently produced American radio program based in Portland, Oregon.

Created and hosted by Julie Sabatier, the show explores do-it-yourself ideas from a wide range of perspectives. Rendered centers around creative people as well as the processes and resources used to create various skills, communities, and ideas.

== History ==
Rendered began as a half-hour monthly show titled DIY, Portland on KBOO Community Radio in 2006. When it began airing on Oregon Public Broadcasting in 2010, it changed its name to Destination DIY and hour-long running time. In September 2014, the show joined the national podcast and radio show network Maximum Fun. In February 2015, the show changed its name to Rendered. The last episode appeared 8/31/2015.

== Format ==
Each episode features edited interviews with individuals, connected by narrative commentary from Sabatier. Topics include gender and the economy, as well as more traditional DIY topics, such as construction of tiny houses. Sabatier told Portland Monthly magazine that each minute of the show takes about an hour to create, from recording interviews to editing the episode's final cut.

Rendered broadcasts full shows and show segments in the Pacific Northwest through NPR's Northwest News Network and nationwide through Public Radio Exchange. The show is also available as a free podcast. Rendered segments air on several radio stations, including Oregon Public Broadcasting, Austins's KUT, and San Francisco's KALW.

== Response ==
The Portland Mercury described the format of Rendered in an article about Portland podcasts: "Destination DIY goes beyond the crafts 'n' home repair often associated with the term 'DIY' to encompass anything people can do themselves—from home funerals and taxidermy to representing yourself in court. Moreover, the show maintains an artful balance of general interest content and local events." In January 2011, Sunset named Sabatier "Portland's DIY Queen" and wrote that the show "taps into the zeitgeist that is red hot in the West." Radio Survivor reported on Destination DIY's crowd-funding strategy in 2013 and described the show as a "polished production on par with a national public radio program."

Portland television station KGW has reported on two Rendered "Makin' It" parties. Sustainable Business Oregon also reported on the "Makin' It" parties and featured an interview with Sabatier.

== Funding ==
Rendered is primarily listener-funded. In 2011, the show funded a year-long season with a Kickstarter campaign that raised $9,750. In 2013, the show relaunched as a monthly podcast after raising $14,801 in an IndieGoGo campaign. The show also lists several business and non-profit sponsors and received Regional Arts & Culture Council grants in 2011 and 2013.

== Rendered episodes ==
Hour-long episodes

- "Representing Yourself" (August 17, 2010)
- "DIY Economy" (August 26, 2010)
- "Doing It Ourselves" (November 9, 2010)
- "DIY Rituals" (Released December 3, 2010)
- "I Made That" (March 24, 2011)
- "DIY Disasters" (January 22, 2012)
- "Conversations" (April 19, 2012)
- "You Are An Authority" (February 21, 2013)
- "Old School DIY" (Released June 25, 2013)
- "Daunting DIY" (July 15, 2013)

Podcast-only episodes

- "Collective Nouns" (October 17, 2010)
- "Economy of Kids" (February 24, 2011)
- "Worm Bin Disaster" (November 15, 2011)
- "Fish Disasters" (November 29, 2011)
- "Chariots of Rubber" (December 12, 2011)
- "Disaster Challenge" (December 7, 2011)
- "DIY Book Tour" (December 21, 2011)
- "High Rocks" (January 25, 2012)
- "Gloria's Secret Cafe" (March 29, 2012)
- "Seattle Maker Faire" (June 4, 2012)
- "The Un-Road Trip" (August 1, 2012)
- "From the XOXO Festival" (September 18, 2012)

Podcast and radio episodes

- "Salty & Sweet" (November 11, 2013)
- "DIY Kids" (January 17, 2014)
- "For the Love of Bees" (February 17, 2014)
- "Figures in Flight" (March 10, 2014)
- "Love, DIY Style" (August, 2014)
- "Mother of Invention" (September 29, 2014)
- "Teen Inventors" (July 21, 2014)
- "Health Care Hackers" (June 21, 2014)
- "Hvoom with Hvam" (May 19, 2014)
- "The Sweet Science" (April 21, 2014)

Thirty-one older episodes are archived on Radio for All.
