= Optics Software for Layout and Optimization =

Optics Software for Layout and Optimization (OSLO) is an optical design program originally developed at the University of Rochester in the 1970s. The first commercial version was produced in 1976 by Sinclair Optics. Since then, OSLO has been rewritten several times as computer technology has advanced. In 1993, Sinclair Optics acquired the GENII program for optical design, and many of the features of GENII are now included in OSLO. Lambda Research Corporation (Littleton MA) purchased the program from Sinclair Optics in 2001.

The OSLO software is used by scientists and engineers to design lenses, reflectors, optical instruments, laser collimators, and illumination systems. It is also used for simulation and analysis of optical systems using both geometrical and physical optics. In addition to optical design and analysis, OSLO provides a complete technical software development system including interactive graphics, math, and database libraries.

== Applications ==
OSLO provides an integrated software environment that helps complete contemporary optical design. More than a lens design software, OSLO provides advanced tools for designing medical instrumentation, illuminations systems and telecommunications equipment, to name just a few typical applications. OSLO has been used in a multitude of optical designs including holographic systems, anastigmatic telescopes, gradient index optics, off-axis refractive/diffractive telescopes, the James Webb Space Telescope, aspheric lenses, interferometers, and time-varying designs.

== Capabilities ==
OSLO is primarily used in the lens design process to determine the optimal sizes and shapes of the components in optical systems. OSLO has the capability of modeling a wide range of reflective, refractive and diffractive components. In addition, OSLO is used to simulate and analyze the performance of optical systems. OSLO's CCL (Compiled Command Language), which is a subset of the C programming language, can be used to develop specialized optical and lens design software tools for modeling, testing, and tolerancing optical systems.

OSLO has many unique features, for instance slider wheels. This feature allows users to affix up to 32 graphical sliders providing callbacks to default or user-supplied routines that perform evaluation or even full optimization iterations when a slider is moved. Some examples in the use of these slider wheels to design telescopes are provided by Howard.

== Compatibility ==
OSLO works with other software products using a DDE (Dynamic Data Exchange) Client/Server interface. This enables the program to work with products such as MATLAB to create a multi-disciplinary environment, such an environment was used to design and analyze the Thirty Meter Telescope (TMT).

== Editions ==
OSLO is available in one educational and one commercial edition.

=== Free educational product ===
• OSLO EDU

OSLO EDU can be downloaded from the Lambda Research Corporation web site.

The OSLO Optics Reference, which can be downloaded as a PDF, provides a self-contained introductory course in optical design.

=== Commercial product ===
• OSLO Premium

== See also ==
- Optical lens design
