= Light board operator =

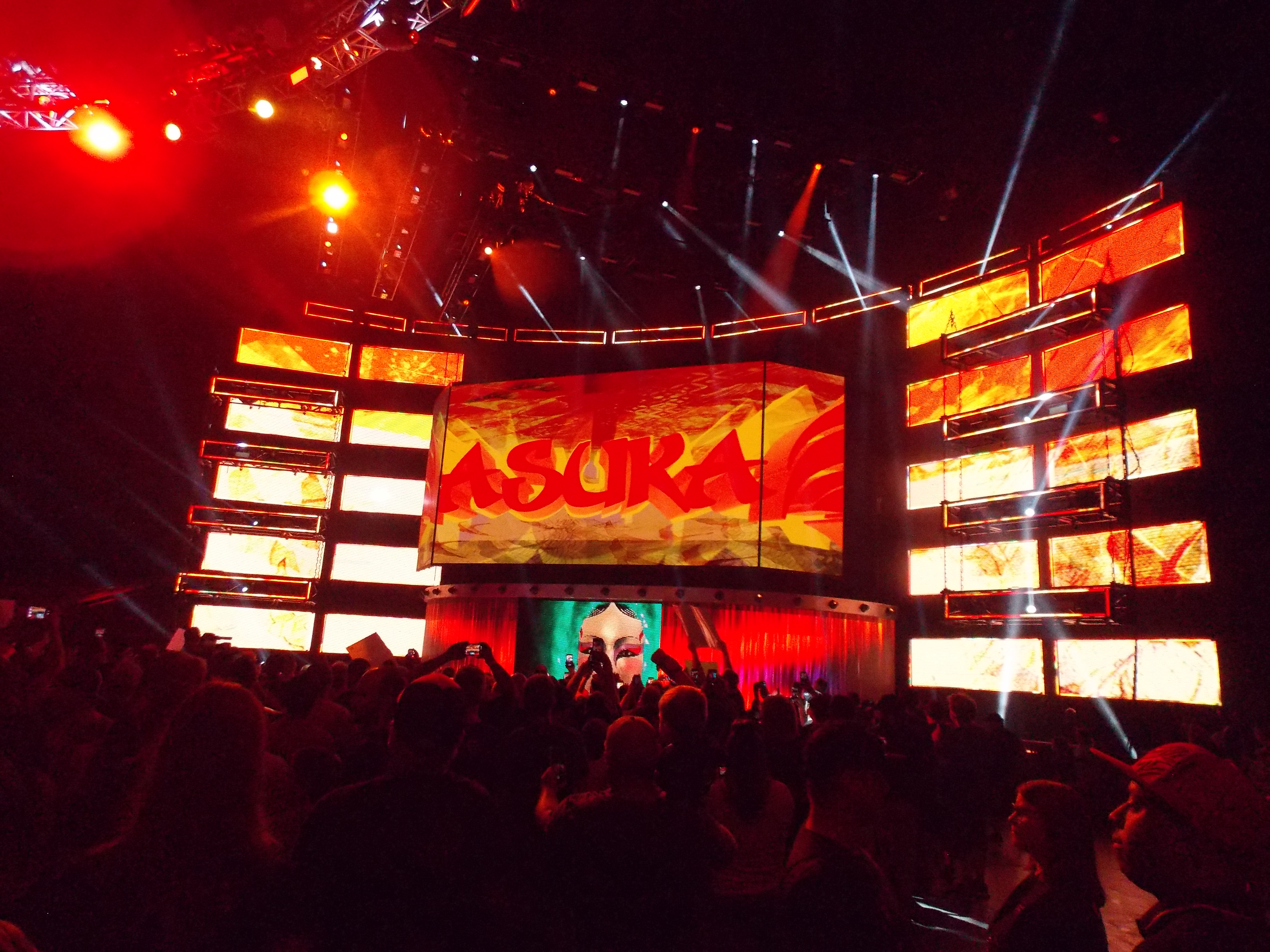
An example of stage lighting controlled by a light board operator during a live WWE televised event.

The light board operator (commonly referred to as the "Light Op" or "Board Op"), is the electrician who operates and may even program the light board. They are considered part of the "Electrics" Department or LX Department. All non-design elements of lighting will be handled by the LX Department, i.e. electricians. Light board operators mainly are responsible for decoding the light designer's ideas from paper to opening night ready. In some cases, the light board operator is also the light designer.

This position carry outs all the cues for the production, essentially functioning as a "human light switch", from a light board console. The scope of the cues can differ depending on the production needs; examples like cutting all lights so a spotlight can shine on a single actor or dimming lights at the start of a production or even a complex scene incorporating several rapid-fire lighting cues paired to certain sounds. Many cues are even programmed by light board operators, a skill that is necessary for the modern day light board operator.

Light board operators also have to be attentive, being ready for any quick adjustments needed during a live production, where failures or improv can occur at any time. This profession is also not limited to just theaters, any event where lighting is a critical part of the experience, such as concerts or live events, expect to see a light board operator behind the scenes.

== Responsibilities ==
The light board operator has many crucial responsibilities in the development of theatrical productions. Depending on the budget and the size of the production, responsibilities will vary in importance and scope. For smaller productions, the light board operator may also hold other positions, such as the lighting designer, master electrician and stage manager. Therefore, job requirements may include to create a lighting plot, and perform a complete hang and focus of the stage lights, in addition to their duties as board operator. In more professional environments, such as on Broadway, the light board operator is a highly specialized professional who is usually well versed in the intricacies of a wide variety of lighting instruments and control consoles, and able to easily program complex lighting cues involving multiple fixtures and other components.

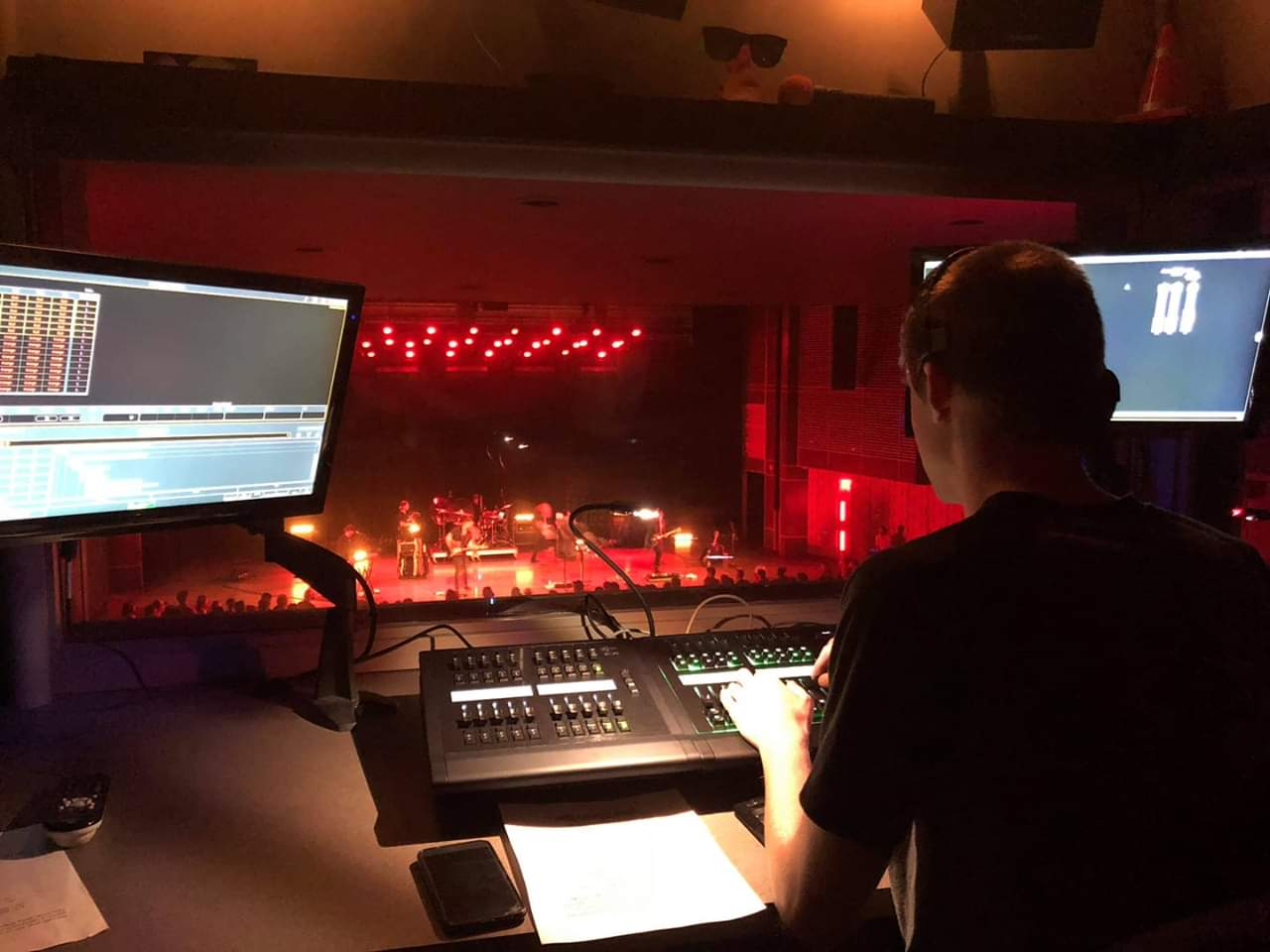
Light Board Operator behind a light board console.

=== Programming ===
Light board operators have the responsibility for ensuring the programming of the light board console is fully functional and ready prior to technical week. Programming has been made a lot easier due to the advancements of technology, specifically the software aspect, making the task of programming the light board console for experienced light board operators straightforward and methodical.

Some tasks that a light board operator is required to program include but not limited to:

==== Console Configuration ====
Configuring a console is required prior to any programming being done. The light board operator must be very familiar with the console and the console's abilities. Consoles can vary from the older manual boards, where buttons and faders have to manually be pressed, to modern consoles where there are touch screens and many of the settings and cues can be programmed to run with the press of a single button.

==== Cue Creation ====
This is just the process where, in coordination with the light designer and stage manager, each specific scene or moment in a production the lighting is calibrated to meet the design plans. Each light's specifications, like color or intensity is chosen and its positioning relative to the stage and actors as well. This process is very crucial to the production as it is one of the factors which sets the tone that is being conveyed to the audience.

==== Cue Sequencing ====
During a performance, the light board operator executes cues that coordinate with stage action, ensuring that transitions maintain the production's pacing.

=== Rehearsals ===
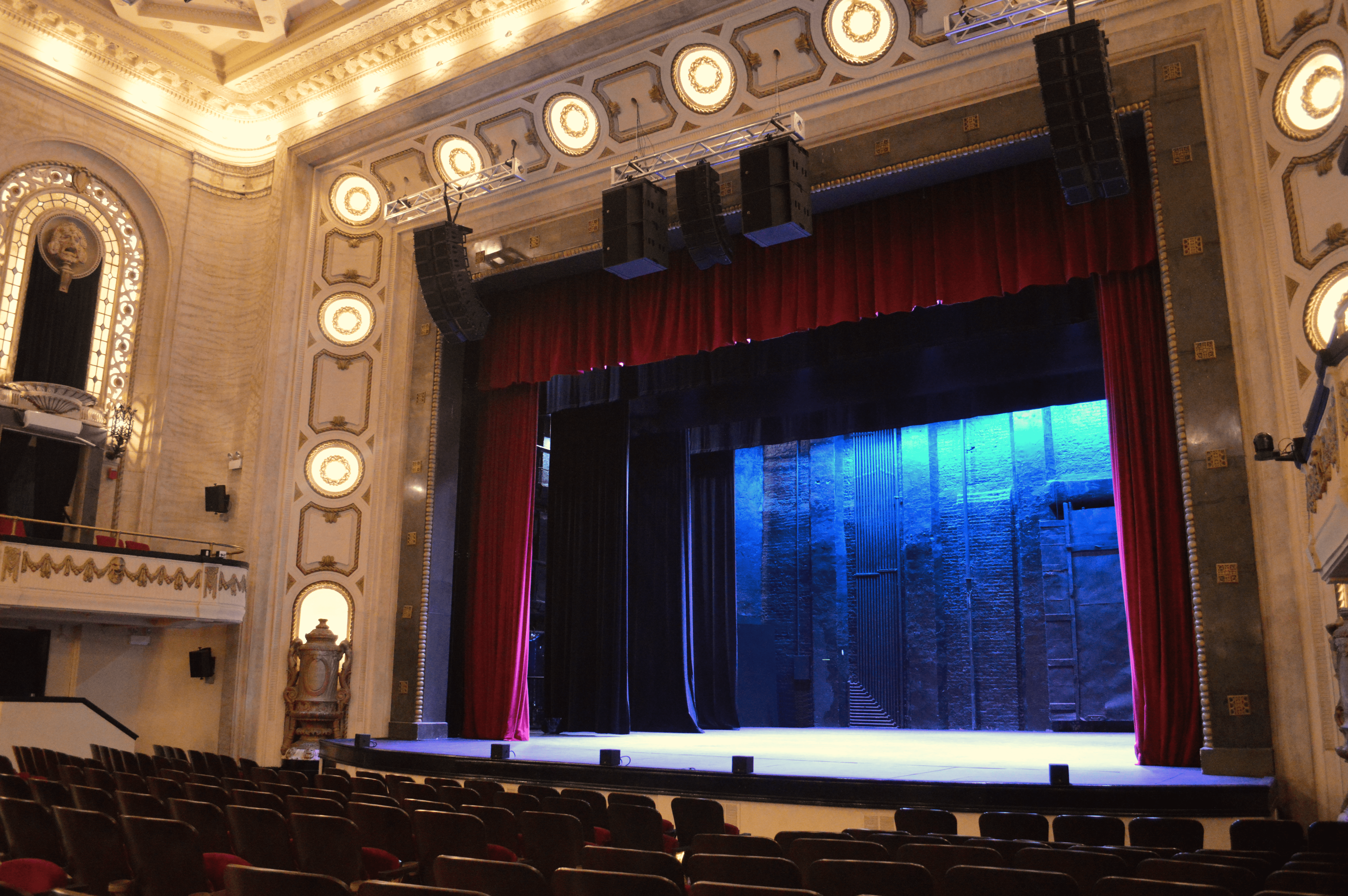
Studebaker Theater Stage and Proscenium

During rehearsals, the light board operators work closely with the stage manager and lighting designer to program the light board console. For smaller productions, it may just be the stage manager and light board operator. Working together they coordinate the stage lighting, in accordance to the needs of each scene of the play. The lighting designer, if there is one, alongside the running crew and light board operator will organize lights on a batten in the theater's fly system, as well as any other light or sound system that needs to be set up.

=== Technical Rehearsals ===
During technical rehearsals, the light board operator must ensure all cues are properly working and synchronized with what is happening on stage. During technical week, light board operators are testing lighting equipment and that the light board console is free of any bugs. Checks will be run everyday to find any issues that must be immediately solved to ensure the technical aspect of the production are opening night ready.

=== Communication ===
Throughout the entire production life cycle, light board operators are in constant talks with the light designer, stage manager and even the director, communicating any changes that need to be made. Communication still continues during runs of the production in front of a live audience, just in case there is an issue with lighting that must be resolved on the spot.

=== Safety ===
As all other aspects of theater, safety is of the utmost priorities. Light board operators must adhere to the industry safety standards set by OSHA (Occupational Safety and Health Administration). Other agencies such as the USITT(United States Institute of Theatre Technology) and the IATSE (International Alliance of Theatrical Stage Employees) also put out a set of guidelines and rules that should be followed.

== Tools ==
Many hardware and software tools are required to perform the job of light board operator. These tools can be either hardware or software, as well as industry-specific tools. A laptop is considered one of the most essential tools to a lightboard operator due to the fact it is one of the most common interface connecting the software to the hardware.

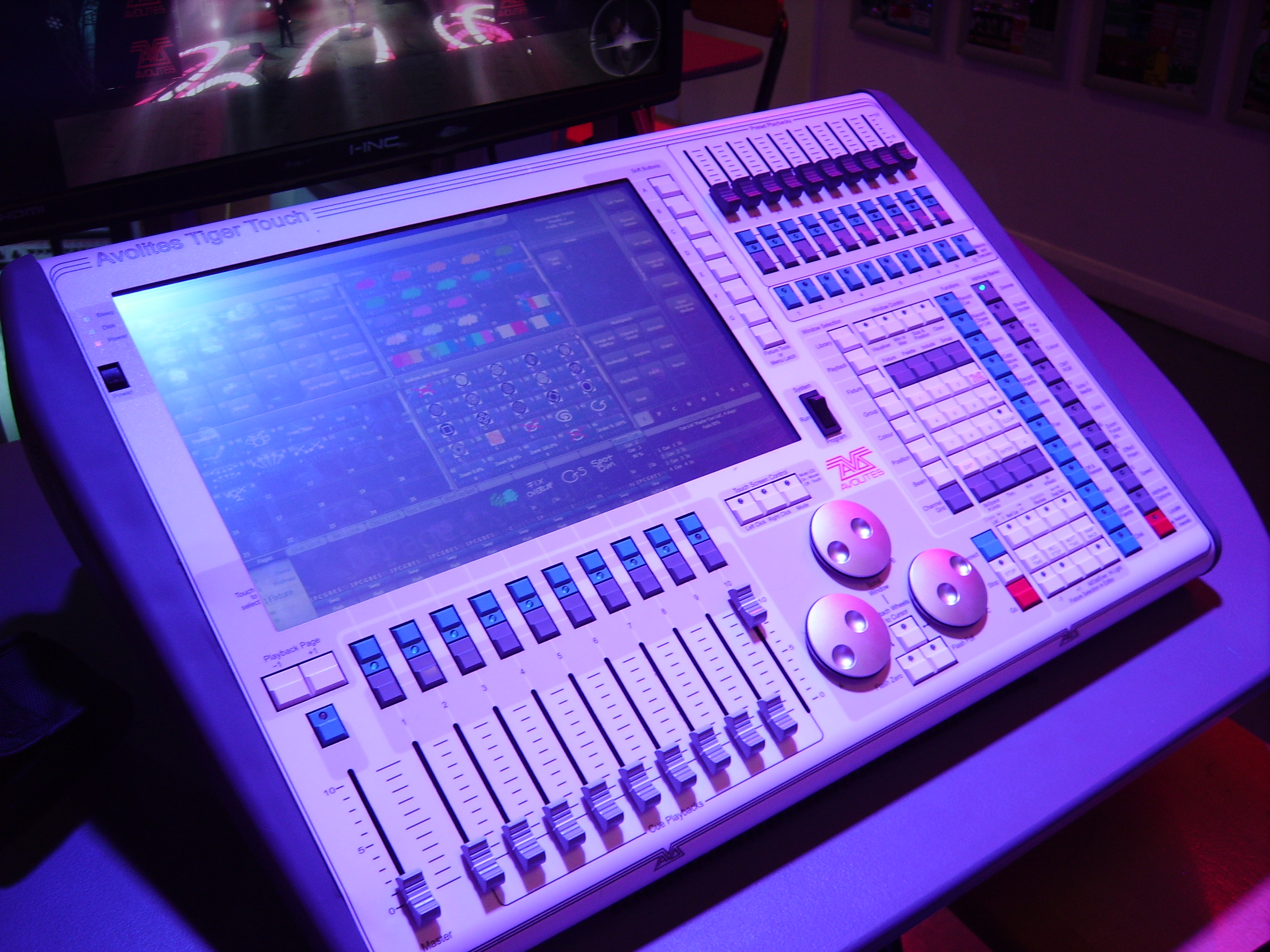
Avolites Tiger Touch console used to control lighting cues.

Lighting control consoles are used in almost all productions. Consoles are complex tools that are meant to consolidate lighting control into one organized system. Older consoles have more physical controls, where more input is required from the light board operator. The newer more computerized consoles have more automated processes, which is usually paired with a touchscreen. Below are some of the different types of controllers:

=== Personal computer-based controller ===
This is a software application that is used on laptops to emulate lighting board consoles. Personal computer-based controllers are often cheaper to use than other types of consoles.

=== Preset boards ===
Preset boards are often used for smaller productions because of their simpler and much more limited features. These boards consist of a fewer number of faders and dimmers compared to more modern consoles. The console also needs to be manually operated.

=== Memory consoles ===
Memory consoles can be found in more higher budget and complex productions, such as those found on Broadway. Reason being these console have the ability to store memory of cues. So the cues can be stored into memory and automatically be sequenced during a production. These consoles also allow for more control of each lighting apparatus, such that the lighting equipment is modern.

=== Moving light controllers ===
Moving light-controllers are similar to memory consoles but primarily control automated lighting systems where movement of the lighting apparatus is very crucial to the production.

=== Remote focus unit ===
A remote focus unit is a handheld device to control the movement of lighting apparatuses. These are used by light board operators on higher budget productions to personally control important lights like a spotlight or a light that is placed in some precarious position.

It is not unusual to use MIDI Show Control, Open Sound Control, or Timecode (SMPTE Time Code) to synchronize the lighting, video, and audio consoles.

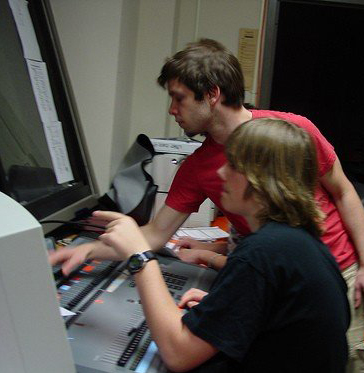
Two light board operators programming a light board.

== Career path ==
Careers for light board operators tend to start off at entry-level positions like lighting technicians, stagehands or even internships. These positions tend to teach a lot of hands-on experience and knowledge that is passed on from more senior positions. Also many light board operators have started their careers in places other than theater companies, like production companies and venue companies(i.e. concerts, speeches, conventions).

== See also ==
- Dimmer
- Electrician (theater)
- Film crew
- Sound board
- Spotlight operator
- Stagecraft
- Television crew
