= Surface imperfections (optics) =

Standards used to define surface quality

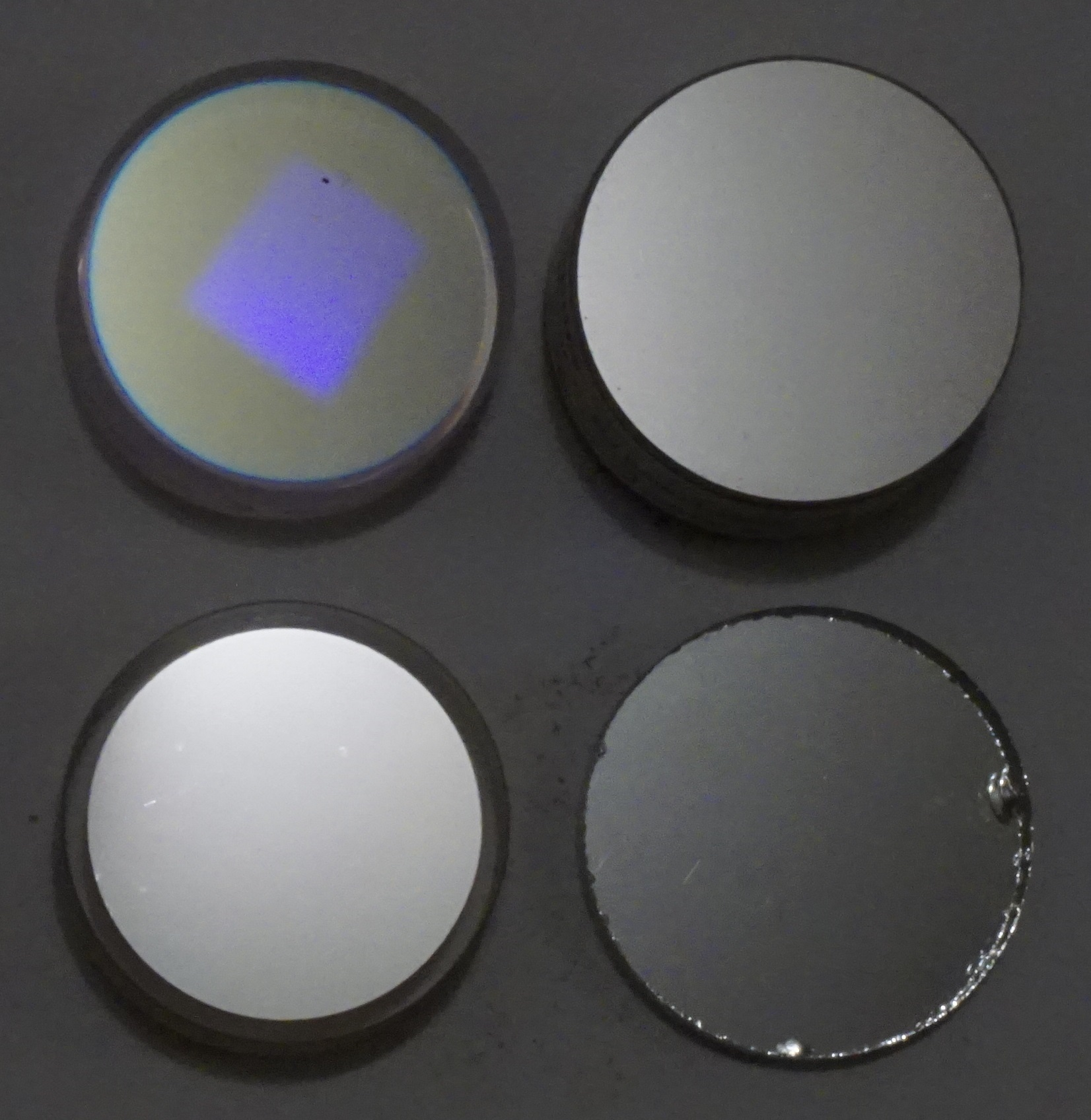
Four types of mirrors; The bottom right shows visible scratch near the center and abundance of edge chips

Surface imperfections on optical surfaces such as lenses or mirrors, can be caused during the manufacturing of the part or handling. These imperfections are part of the surface and cannot be removed by cleaning. Surface quality is characterized either by the American military standard notation (eg "60-40") or by specifying RMS (root mean square) roughness (eg "0.3 nm RMS"). American notation focuses on how visible surface defects are, and is a "cosmetic" specification. RMS notation is an objective measurable property of the surface. Tighter specifications increase the costs of fabricating optical elements but looser ones affect performance.

While surface imperfections can be labeled "cosmetic defects", they are not purely cosmetic. Optics for laser applications are more sensitive to surface quality as any imperfections can lead to laser-induced damage. In some cases, imperfections in optical elements will be directly imaged as defects in the image plane. Optical systems requiring high radiation intensity tend to be sensitive to any loss of power due to surface scattering caused by imperfections. Systems operating in the ultraviolet range require a more demanding standard as the shorter wavelength of the ultraviolet radiation is more sensitive to scattering.

There are many different standards used by optical element manufacturers, designers, and users which vary by geographic region and industry. For example, German manufacturers use ISO 10110, while the US military developed MIL-PRF-13830 and their long-standing use of it has made it the de facto global standard. It is not always possible to translate the scratch grade by one standard to another and sometimes the translation ends up being statistical (sampling defects to ensure that statistically, the percentage rejected elements will be similar in both methods).

Examining surface quality in terms of 'Scratch & Dig' is a specialized skill that takes time to develop. The practice is to compare the element to a standard master (reference). Automated systems now replace the human technician, for flat optics, but recently also for convex and concave lenses. In contrast, 'Roughness' characterization is done with more precise and easier-to-quantify methods.

== Overview of types ==
The various standards separate two main categories for surface quality: scratch & dig and roughness.

A scratch is defined as a long and narrow defect that tears the surface of the glass or coating. There are standards that refer to the degree of visibility, which is the relative brightness of the scratch. In these cases, there is also a standard for the lighting conditions used for the test. Other standards classify scratches according to their dimensions. A dig is defined as a pit, a rough area, or a small crater on the surface of the glass (or any other optical material). All standards measure the physical size of the dig. Some standards include small defects within the glass that are visible through the surface, such as bubbles and inclusions.

Roughness, texture or optical finish is a defect that originates from the element's manufacturing. Texture is a periodical phenomenon with a high spatial frequency (or in other words, in small dimensions), which affects the entire surface and causes the scattering of incident light. A higher value of roughness means a rougher surface. The texture is especially important in cases where the polishing is carried out using new processing methods such as diamond turning, which leaves a residual periodical signature on the surface, affecting the quality of the obtained image or the level of scattering from the surface. The amount of scattered light is proportional to the square of the RMS of the roughness.

== Scratch & Dig ==
=== Military standard MIL-PRF-13830B ===
This is the most common standard in the United States, stemming from a standard that was originally proposed by McLeod and Sherwood of Kodak back in 1945 and evolved in 1954 into the military standard MIL-O-13830A. It defines the quality of the surface by a pair of numbers, the first is a measure of the visibility of the scratch and the second is the size of the dig.

Scratch visibility grades are described by a series of arbitrary numbers: 10, 20, 40, 60, and 80 where the brightest scratches, the easiest to see using the naked eye, are grade 80, while the most difficult to detect are grade 10. A scratch on a tested part is compared with an industrial or military standard (master) on which there are scratches of different degrees of visibility and the comparison is made using the naked eye, under controlled lighting conditions. It is important to recognize that this is a subjective test and its results can vary between different people. The scratches' visibility largely depends on their shape, and contrary to popular belief, there is little correlation between the scratch's visibility grade and its width. One cannot measure the width of a scratch to determine its grade.

On the other hand, a dig's grade is a precise and measurable value. It is the diameter of the largest dig that is found on the tested surface, in units of hundredths of a millimeter. It is customary to use discrete grades of 5, 10, 20, 40, or 50, where of course the larger numbers describe larger imperfections.

There are many default definitions in the MIL standard. For example, the grade that must be required outside the clear aperture (the part of the lens to which the standard applies, also called "effective diameter" or CA) is, in the absence of another definition, 80-50. This is a very basic surface characterization and is easy to achieve. It describes a scratch whose brightness is less than that of a scratch at visibility grade 80 and a dig with a diameter of up to 0.5 mm (50 hundredths = 50/100=0.5). 60-40 is considered "commercial" quality, while for demanding laser applications 20-10 or even 10-5 are used. The scratches on a 10-5 or 20-10 surface can be hard to see, making the visibility standard more subjective. Other standards may work better when precision surfaces are required. Optical coating can change scratch visibility, so for example an element that passes 40-20 before coating can be worse than 60-40 after coating.

Accumulation and concentration rules regulate common situations in which there are multiple defects on the surface of an optical element, and clarify how they should be added up. For example, if one or more scratches are found with the maximum visibility allowed, to pass the test, the sum of the length of these scratches is limited to a quarter of the diameter of the element. The number of digs at the maximum permitted level is determined by dividing the measured clear aperture diameter (in millimeters) by 20, and rounding up. For example, for a clear aperture of 81 mm, 5 digs are allowed at the maximum level.

Since the comparison master is only in possession of the US Army, several commercial masters have been developed that are intended to be compatible, but due to the complexity of the factors that make a scratch visible, these masters are not always compatible with the original and there is no way to match one set to another. For example, a visibility grade 10 scratch on one master can appear brighter than a visibility grade 60 scratch on another master. For this reason, it is recommended to also indicate on the drawing the type of master set to which it must be compared during the test.

Examples of such commercial comparison sets made of plastic or glass are Davidson Optronics, Brysen Optical, and Jenoptik Paddle – sold by ThorLabs and Edmund Optics.

=== ISO 10110-7 ===
This standard is used in the USA, China, Japan, Russia, and all of Europe.

The notation as of 2007 is: 5/ N x A; C N' x A'; L N" x A"; E A''', where N and A represent the number of defects and the maximum size of the defect, N' and A' represent the number of imperfections on the coating and their maximum size, N'' and A'' represent the number of scratches allowed and their maximum width and A''' represents the maximum size of an edge chip (a defect on the rim of the optical element). Only the first part of the characterization, N x A, is mandatory. The rest of the details can be omitted.

A and A' are given as the square root of the area of the defect, in millimeters. These are indicated by discrete values from the series: 4, 2.5, 1.6, 1, 0.63, 0.4, 0.25, ... A" is the width of the widest allowed scratch, in mm. A scratch in this case is defined as a defect longer than 2 mm.

In addition to the limits on the number of defects and their size, the total area of all imperfections must not exceed A×N^{2}. Long defects (scratches) are summed up by their width, independent of length. There is no limit on the number of edge chips, and the concentration of imperfections is limited by the rule that at most 20% of the defects, allowance can be concentrated in an area of 5% of the clear aperture.

A fundamental advantage of ISO is a relatively simple translation between the percentage of light scattered from a surface and the characterization of its surface, according to the formula:

Scatter % = 4 x [(N x A^{2})+(N' x A'^{2})+ N" x A" x Φ]/(π x Φ^{2})

Unlike MIL-PRF-13830B which is cheap and fast to use, but suffers from inaccuracies, the use of the dimensional standard of ISO 10110-7 is more accurate but takes a longer time to test and is therefore expensive. The relatively long test time is derived from the fact that testing according to this standard is carried out using a microscope, comparing sizes of each defect to defects on a master, and because of the large magnification needed the field of view is small, requiring several measurements to map each optical element.

David Aikens, director of Optics and Electro-Optics Standards Council, presented a recommended conversion chart that preserves the level of quality control, or percent fall, in ISO scratch & dig testing versus the military standard. For example 5/2x0.40; L 3 x0.010 is a statistically-equivalent standard to 60-40 of the strict military standard, over a 20 mm opening.

The logical flaw of this dimensional standard is in defining a scratch according only to its width. For example, if a lens with a diameter of 100 mm has a requirement of L 1 x 0.025, a single scratch with a thickness of up to 25 microns is allowed, even if it covers the entire 100 mm diameter. However, if the manufacturer polishes the surface and removes the scratch from the central 95 millimeters of the lens, there will be two scratches each 2.5 mm in length and now the lens will fail the acceptance tests because the characterization allows only one scratch. The illogicality here is obvious: it is not acceptable to reject a component due to a process that improves its quality.

As of 2017, to support quick measurements intended for less sensitive surfaces, ISO 10110-7 also allows the definition of scratches according to their visibility, and the definition of digs according to their diameter, just like MIL-PRF-13830B, using the same grades, for example 60-40.

It is possible to expand and also mark coating imperfections as well as edge chips, similarly the definition in the dimensional standard: 5 / S - D; C S' - D'; E A''' where S and D are the definitions for scratches and digs, S' and D' for these defects on the coating and A''' characterizes edge chip as defined above. As explained about the military standard, it is important to explicitly specify which master set the scratches brightness are to be compared to.

=== MIL-C-48497A ו- MIF-F-48616 ===
These standards are almost as popular as MIL-PRF-13830B but they have become less popular with time.

These standards define scratches and digs according to their physical size and mark their grade with the letters: A, B, C, D, E, F, G (and H which is used only for digs). The letter A represents the narrowest scratch, which is 0.005 mm wide, and the smallest dig, which is 0.05 mm in diameter. On the other hand, the letter G represents a scratch that is 0.12 mm wide and a dig that is 0.7 mm in diameter. A microscope or magnifying glass is used for testing, or sometimes even just using the naked eye to compare to a master.

=== ANSI OP1.002 ===
This American standard was first published in 2006. Just like in the MIL-PRF-13830B standard, ANSI OP1.002 defines digs according to their diameter.

ANSI OP1.002 also supports two separate methods for scratches: visibility and size.

The visibility method defines scratches according to their visibility and is identical in design and terminology to the MIL-PRF-13830B standard. Just like the military standard, it uses two numbers, the first for scratches and the second for digs, maintaining their meaning as in the military standard. Examples: 80-50, 60-40. This method takes advantage of the speed and low cost of the visual inspection and is used for elements with looser tolerances.

The dimensionality method for scratches is based on the MIL-C-48497A standard, which is considered easy to use and functional. The dimensional method uses two letters, the first for scratches and the second for digs. For example: A-A or E-E. This standard is intended for parts with tight surface quality tolerances, such as CCD cover glasses or demanding laser applications.

Dimensions of scratches and digs by OP1.002
Maximum scratch width in microns	Scratch or dig specification letter	Maximum dig diameter in microns
120	G	700
80	F	500
60	E	400
40	D	300
20	C	200
10	B	100
5	A	50
n	An	n

The OP1.002 standard allows using a microscope to compare with the master.

This standard allows a relatively easy translation between the desired scattering level and the surface quality, as mentioned above.

== Roughness ==
=== US military standard MIL-STD-10A ===
This original standard was common in nature, not intended for the characterization of polished surfaces per se. It used parameters that are not typically used for the characterization of optical elements such as average roughness.

=== ASME B46.1-2002 ===
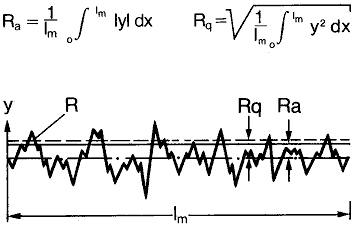
An example of measuring surface roughness. Rq is RMS.

This standard replaced MIL-STD-10A and defines more than forty different parameters including RMS (root mean square), slope, skew, PSD (Power Spectral Density, which is the most comprehensive characteristic), and more. There is a significant improvement in this standard because it allows the characterization of machined surfaces, at different spatial frequencies, which is especially important in cases where the optics were produced using techniques that leave periodic marks, such as caused by diamond turning. For most uses it is sufficient to use RMS. In all cases, it is important to specify the range in which the calculation is performed because without defining the spatial frequency range in which the measurement is performed, this standard is meaningless.

=== ISO 10110-8 (2010) ===
This popular standard, similar to ASME B46.1, also defines the RMS of the surface over a specific length scale, PSD and more. It differs from the ASME specification by using symbols instead of words.

== See also ==
- Surface roughness
- Scattering from rough surfaces
- Quality control
- Visual inspection
