= Rayshade =

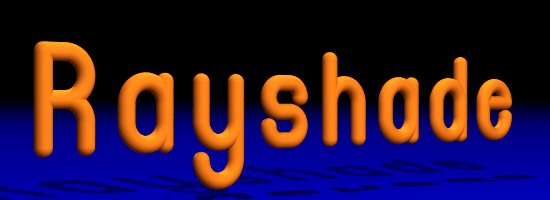
Rayshade Raytracer

Rayshade is a software application for ray tracing (3D rendering) from a text 3D model description input file into a finished, realistic image.

The first version was written between 1987 and 1988 at Princeton University. It is written by Craig E. Kolb in C, yacc, and lex. It runs on many different Unix platforms, and was also later ported to MS-DOS. It does not have a graphical user interface.

== Screenshots ==
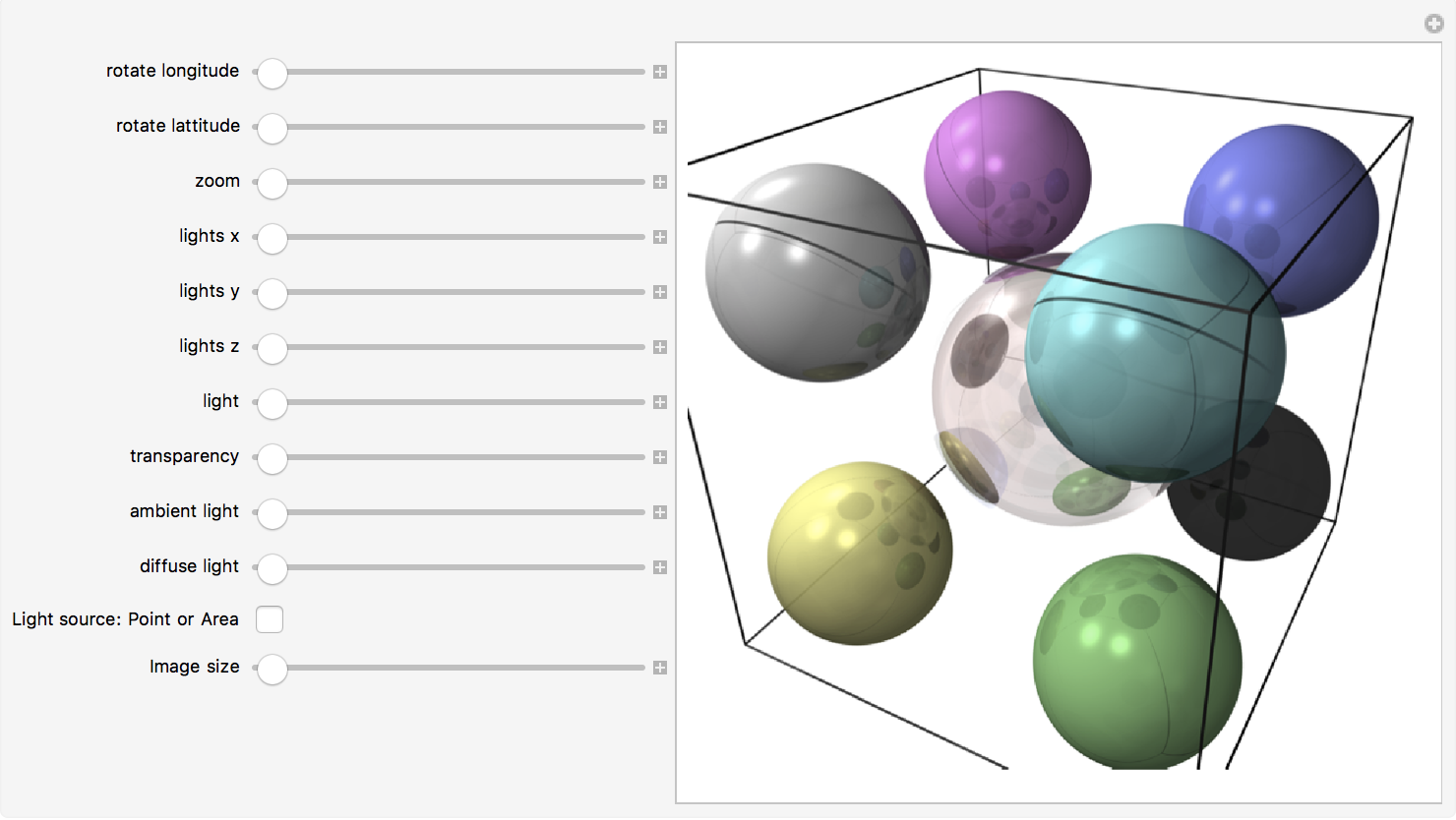

== Example code ==
/* Just a ball */
sphere
surface  ambient .05 .05 .05  diffuse .5 .5 .5 specular .5 .5 .5  specpow 60 reflect .2
1. 0 0 0
/* Scene setup */
eyep 1.7 -3.15 2.6
lookup 0. 0. 0.
up 0. 0. 1.
light 0.4 0.4 0.4  directional 1. 0. 1.
background  1. 1. 1.
