= Sunflow =

- Developer: Christopher Kulla
- Stable release: 0.07.2 / February 9, 2007; 18 years ago
- Repository: github.com/skrat/sunflow
- Written in: Java
- Operating system: Cross-platform
- Type: Ray tracer
- License: MIT License
- Website: sunflow.sourceforge.net

Sunflow is an open-source global illumination rendering system written in Java. The project is currently inactive; the last announcement on the program's official page was made in 2007.
