= Holomatix Rendition =

- Developer(s): Holomatix Ltd
- Final release: 1.0.458 / 8 October 2010
- Operating system: Windows, macOS, Linux
- Type: Raytracer

SprayTrace
- Developer(s): Holomatix Ltd
- Final release: 1.5.34 / 2014
- Operating system: Windows
- Type: Raytracer

Holomatix Rendition is a discontinued raytracing renderer, which is broadly compatible with mental ray. Its rendering method is similar to that of FPrime in that it displays a continuously refined rendered image until final production quality image is achieved. This differs to traditional rendering methods where the rendered image is built up block-by-block.

It was developed by Holomatix Ltd, based in London, UK. As of December 2011, the Rendition product has been retired and is no longer available or being updated. The product is no longer mentioned on the developer's web site, either. The successor is SprayTrace.

== Features ==
- Realtime (or progressive) rendering engine
- Based on mental ray shader and lighting model
- Supports 3rd-party shaders compiled for mental ray

== Rendering Features ==
As it uses the same shader and lighting model as mental ray, Rendition supports the same rendering and ray tracing features as mental ray, including:

- Final Gather
- Global Illumination (through Photon Mapping)
- Polygonal and Parametric Surfaces (NURBS, Subdivision)
- Displacement Mapping
- Motion Blur
- Lens Shaders

== Supported platforms ==
- Autodesk Maya, up to and including 2011 SAP
- Autodesk 3ds Max, up to and including 2010
- Softimage|XSI, up to and including 2011, but not 2011 SP1
