= Optical lens design =

Optical lens design is the process of designing a lens to meet a set of performance requirements and constraints, including cost and manufacturing limitations. Parameters include surface profile types (spherical, aspheric, holographic, diffractive, etc.), as well as radius of curvature, distance to the next surface, material type and optionally tilt and decenter. The process is computationally intensive, using ray tracing or other techniques to model how the lens affects light that passes through it.

== Design requirements ==
Performance requirements can include:

1. Optical performance (image quality): This is quantified by various metrics, including encircled energy, modulation transfer function, Strehl ratio, ghost reflection control, and pupil performance (size, location and aberration control); the choice of the image quality metric is application specific.
2. Physical requirements such as weight, static volume, dynamic volume, center of gravity and overall configuration requirements.
3. Environmental requirements: ranges for temperature, pressure, vibration and electromagnetic shielding.

Design constraints can include realistic lens element center and edge thicknesses, minimum and maximum air-spaces between lenses, maximum constraints on entrance and exit angles, physically realizable glass index of refraction and dispersion properties.

Manufacturing costs and delivery schedules are also a major part of optical design. The price of an optical glass blank of given dimensions can vary by a factor of fifty or more, depending on the size, glass type, index homogeneity quality, and availability, with BK7 usually being the cheapest. Costs for larger and/or thicker optical blanks of a given material, above 100–150 mm, usually increase faster than the physical volume due to increased blank annealing time required to achieve acceptable index homogeneity and internal stress birefringence levels throughout the blank volume. Availability of glass blanks is driven by how frequently a particular glass type is made by a given manufacturer, and can seriously affect manufacturing cost and schedule.

== Process ==
Lenses can first be designed using paraxial theory to position images and pupils, then real surfaces inserted and optimized. Paraxial theory can be skipped in simpler cases and the lens directly optimized using real surfaces. Lenses are first designed using average index of refraction and dispersion (see Abbe number) properties published in the glass manufacturer's catalog and through glass model calculations. However, the properties of the real glass blanks will vary from this ideal; index of refraction values can vary by as much as 0.0003 or more from catalog values, and dispersion can vary slightly. These changes in index and dispersion can sometimes be enough to affect the lens focus location and imaging performance in highly corrected systems.

The lens blank manufacturing process is as follows:

1. The glass batch ingredients for a desired glass type are mixed in a powder state,
2. the powder mixture is melted in a furnace,
3. the fluid is further mixed while molten to maximize batch homogeneity,
4. poured into lens blanks and
5. annealed according to empirically determined time-temperature schedules.

The glass blank pedigree, or "melt data", can be determined for a given glass batch by making small precision prisms from various locations in the batch and measuring their index of refraction on a spectrometer, typically at five or more wavelengths. Lens design programs have curve fitting routines that can fit the melt data to a selected dispersion curve, from which the index of refraction at any wavelength within the fitted wavelength range can be calculated. A re-optimization, or "melt re-comp", can then be performed on the lens design using measured index of refraction data where available. When manufactured, the resulting lens performance will more closely match the desired requirements than if average glass catalog values for index of refraction were assumed.

Delivery schedules are impacted by glass and mirror blank availability and lead times to acquire, the amount of tooling a shop must fabricate prior to starting on a project, the manufacturing tolerances on the parts (tighter tolerances mean longer fab times), the complexity of any optical coatings that must be applied to the finished parts, further complexities in mounting or bonding lens elements into cells and in the overall lens system assembly, and any post-assembly alignment and quality control testing and tooling required. Tooling costs and delivery schedules can be reduced by using existing tooling at any given shop wherever possible, and by maximizing manufacturing tolerances to the extent possible.

== Lens optimization ==
A simple two-element air-spaced lens has nine variables (four radii of curvature, two thicknesses, one airspace thickness, and two glass types). A multi-configuration lens corrected over a wide spectral band and field of view over a range of focal lengths and over a realistic temperature range can have a complex design volume having over one hundred dimensions.

Lens optimization techniques that can navigate this multi-dimensional space and proceed to local minima have been studied since the 1940s, beginning with early work by James G. Baker, and later by Feder, Wynne, Glatzel, Grey and others. Prior to the development of digital computers, lens optimization was a hand-calculation task using trigonometric and logarithmic tables to plot 2-D cuts through the multi-dimensional space. Computerized ray tracing allows the performance of a lens to be modelled quickly, so that the design space can be searched rapidly. This allows design concepts to be rapidly refined. Popular optical design software includes Zemax's OpticStudio, Synopsys's Code V, and Lambda Research's OSLO. In most cases the designer must first choose a viable design for the optical system, and then numerical modelling is used to refine it. The designer ensures that designs optimized by the computer meet all requirements, and makes adjustments or restarts the process when they do not.

== See also ==
- Optical engineering
- Fabrication and testing (optical components)
- Ray transfer matrix analysis
- Photographic lens design
- Surface imperfections (optics)
- Stray light
