= The Interlude of the Student and the Girl =

The Interlude of the Student and the Girl (Latin: Interludium de clerico et puella) is one of the earliest known secular plays in English, first performed c. 1300. The text is written in vernacular English, in an East Midlands dialect that suggests either Lincoln or Beverley as its origin, although its title is given in Latin. The name of its playwright is unknown. Only two scenes, with a total of 84 lines of verse in rhyming couplets, are extant and survive in a manuscript held by the British Library, dated to either the late twelfth or very early thirteenth century. Glynne Wickham provides both the original text and a rendering in modern English in his English Moral Interludes (1976). In tone and form, the interlude seems to be the closest play in English to the contemporaneous French farces, such as The Boy and the Blind Man, and is related to later English farcical plays, such as the anonymous Calisto and Melibea (published c. 1525) and John Heywood's The Foure PP (c. 1530). It was most likely performed by itinerant players, possibly making use of a performing dog. In Early English Stages (1981), Wickham points to the existence of this play as evidence that the old-fashioned view that comedy began in England with Gammer Gurton's Needle and Ralph Roister Doister in the 1550s is mistaken, ignoring as it does a rich tradition of medieval comic drama. He argues that the play's "command of dramatic action and of comic mood and method is so deft as to make it well-nigh unbelievable" that it was the first of its kind in England.

== Synopsis ==
A student tries to woo a girl called Molly. Having confirmed that neither her father nor mother are at home, he declares his love for her: "I love you more than my life", he insists. She rejects him, complaining of the deceitfulness of students: "For many a good woman have they brought to shame!" He seeks the help of an old woman, Mother Eloise. He laments that he would rather die than live without Molly. He offers the old woman substantial financial rewards if she would agree to act as his go-between and reconcile him with the girl. The old woman becomes defensive and insists that whoever advised him to seek out her assistance has lied, for she is a God-fearing woman who would never involve herself in such matters.

== See also ==
- Medieval theatre

== Sources ==
- Axton, Richard, ed. 1979. Three Rastell Plays. Tudor Interludes ser. Cambridge: Brewer. ISBN 0-859-91047-4.
- Banham, Martin, ed. 1998. The Cambridge Guide to Theatre. Cambridge: Cambridge University Press. ISBN 0-521-43437-8.
- Bevington, David M. 1962. From Mankind to Marlowe: Growth of Structure in the Popular Drama of Tudor England. Cambridge, MA: Harvard University Press.
- Brockett, Oscar G. and Franklin J. Hildy. 2003. History of the Theatre. Ninth edition, International edition. Boston: Allyn and Bacon. ISBN 0-205-41050-2.
- Chambers, E. K. 1903. The Mediaeval Stage. Vol. 2. Oxford: Oxford University Press. Available online at the Internet Archive.
- Dillon, Janette. 2006. The Cambridge Introduction to Early English Theatre. Cambridge Introductions to Literature ser. Cambridge: Cambridge University Press. ISBN 978-0-521-83474-2.
- Meredith, Peter. 1998. "Medieval Drama in Europe: England, Scotland and Ireland; Cornwall and Wales." In Banham (1998, 698–700).
- Richardson, Christine, and Jackie Johnston. 1991. Medieval Drama. English Dramatists ser. London: Macmillan. ISBN 0-333-45477-4.
- Wickham, Glynne, ed. 1976. English Moral Interludes. London: Dent. ISBN 0-874-71766-3.
- Wickham, Glynne. 1981. Early English Stages: 1300—1660. Vol. 3. London: Routledge. ISBN 0-710-00218-1.
