= Stagecraft =

Technical craft for theatrical, film, video production

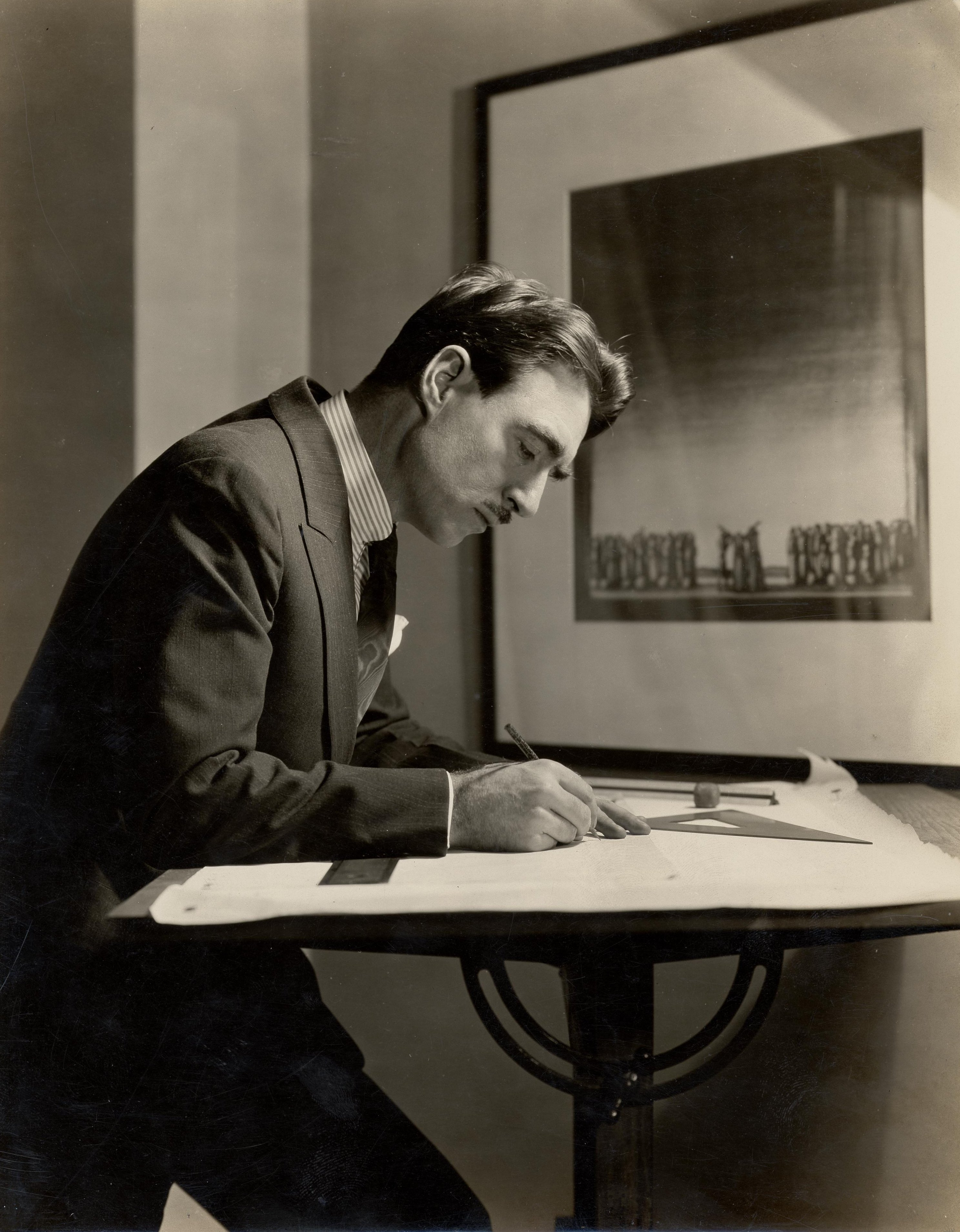
Early stagecraft master Robert Edmond Jones drawing at a high table (c. 1920).

Stagecraft is a technical skill in theatrical, film, and video production. It includes constructing and rigging scenery; hanging and focusing of lighting; fabrication and procurement of costumes; make-up; stage management; audio engineering; and procurement of props. Stagecraft is distinct from the wider umbrella term of scenography. Considered a technical rather than an artistic field, it is primarily the practical implementation of a scenic designer's artistic vision.

Stagecraft may be executed by a single person (often the stage manager of a smaller production) who arranges all scenery, costumes, lighting, and sound. Regional theaters and larger community theaters will generally have a technical director and a complement of designers, each of whom has a direct hand in their respective designs. Within significantly larger productions (for example, a modern Broadway show) staging a show requires the work of carpenters, painters, electricians, stagehands, stitchers, wigmakers, etc..

== History ==
=== Ancient Greece ===
Greek theatre made extensive use of stagecraft, and Greek vocabulary and practice continue to influence contemporary Western stagecraft. The defining element of a Greek theatre's stage was the skene, a structure at the back of the stage, often featuring three doors. The usual setting for a classical Greek tragedy was a palace, and skenes were decorated to support that setting.

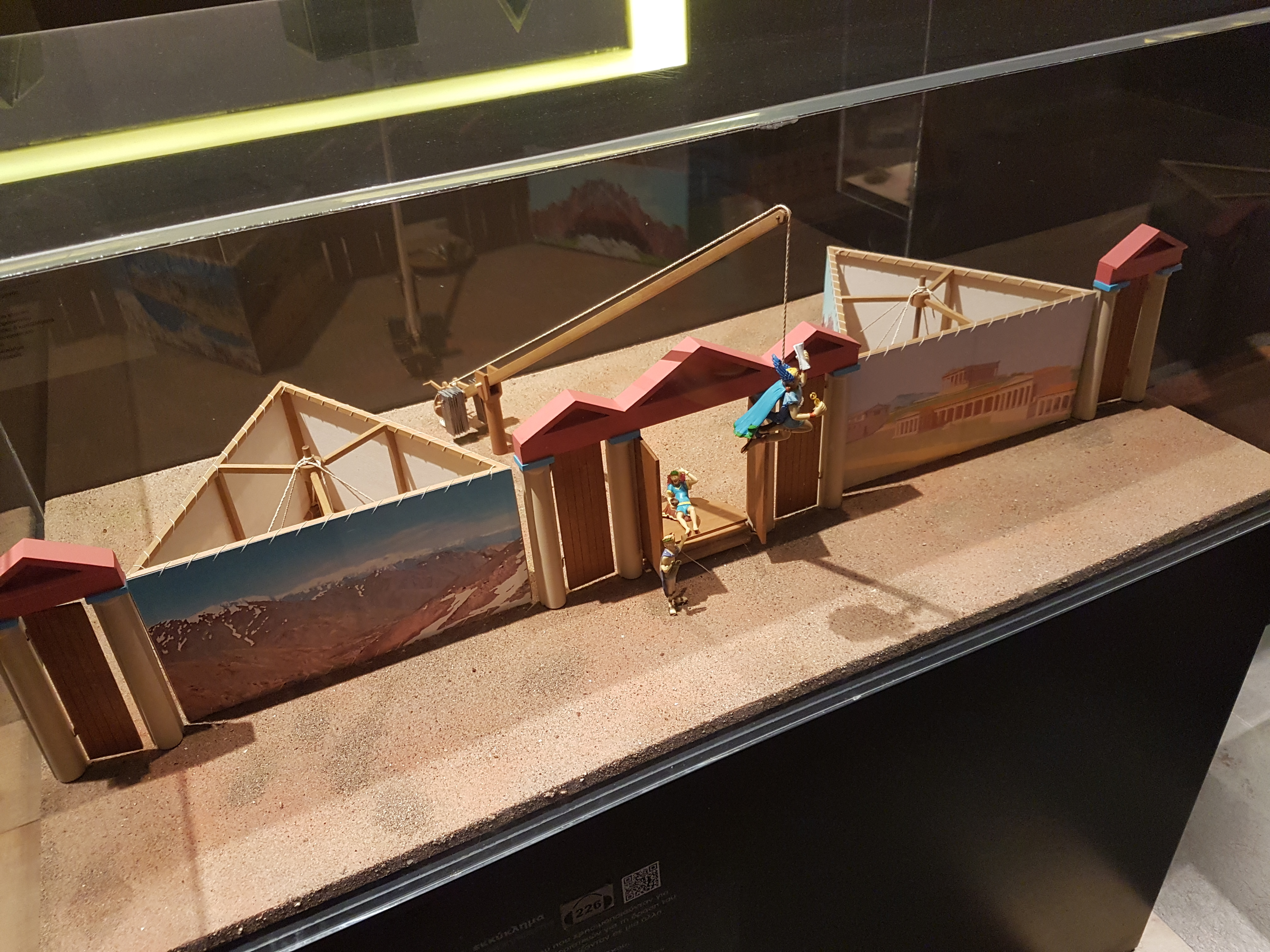
A tabletop model of a set with two periaktoi

On the audience side of the skene, what are now known as flats could be hung. Flats evolved from one-sided to two-sided painted flats, which would be mounted and centered on a rotating pin. Rope would run around each consecutive pin, allowing the flats to be turned for scene changes. The double-sided-flat eventually evolved into the periaktos.

Greek stagecraft was essential to the storytelling of its works. An ekkyklema, similar to a contemporary wagon, was used to present the death of a character by rolling out their dead body, instead of showing their death onstage. The mechane, a crane for lifting actors over the skene, supported the conclusions of plays, whose storylines were often suddenly resolved by the introduction of a god. The mechane is the literal source for the contemporary phrase deus ex machina. Performances were lit by sunlight, often taking advantage of the particular time of day to support the story.

=== Medieval Europe ===
Plays of medieval times were held in different towns and cities, often performed by traveling troupes. Like many of their secular counterparts, Churches wanted to spread the message of Christianity via music and plays. By 1300, the performance of liturgical dramas in churches became widespread across Western Europe, and so began the use of mansion stages. A mansion stage is a small wooden platform with supports and a roof, commonly used to represent specific locations (such as Heaven or Hell). The acting area of the stage was called the platea; mansions were placed around the platea, and actors would move between these mansions. As the actors moved between them, the platea would take on the scenic identity of each mansion.

Medieval stages were designed to be erected both indoors or outdoors (as in the Cornish plen-an-gwary amphitheatres). They were played in certain places so the props could be used for the play. Songs and spectacles were often used in plays to encourage audience participation.

=== Victorian-era Europe ===
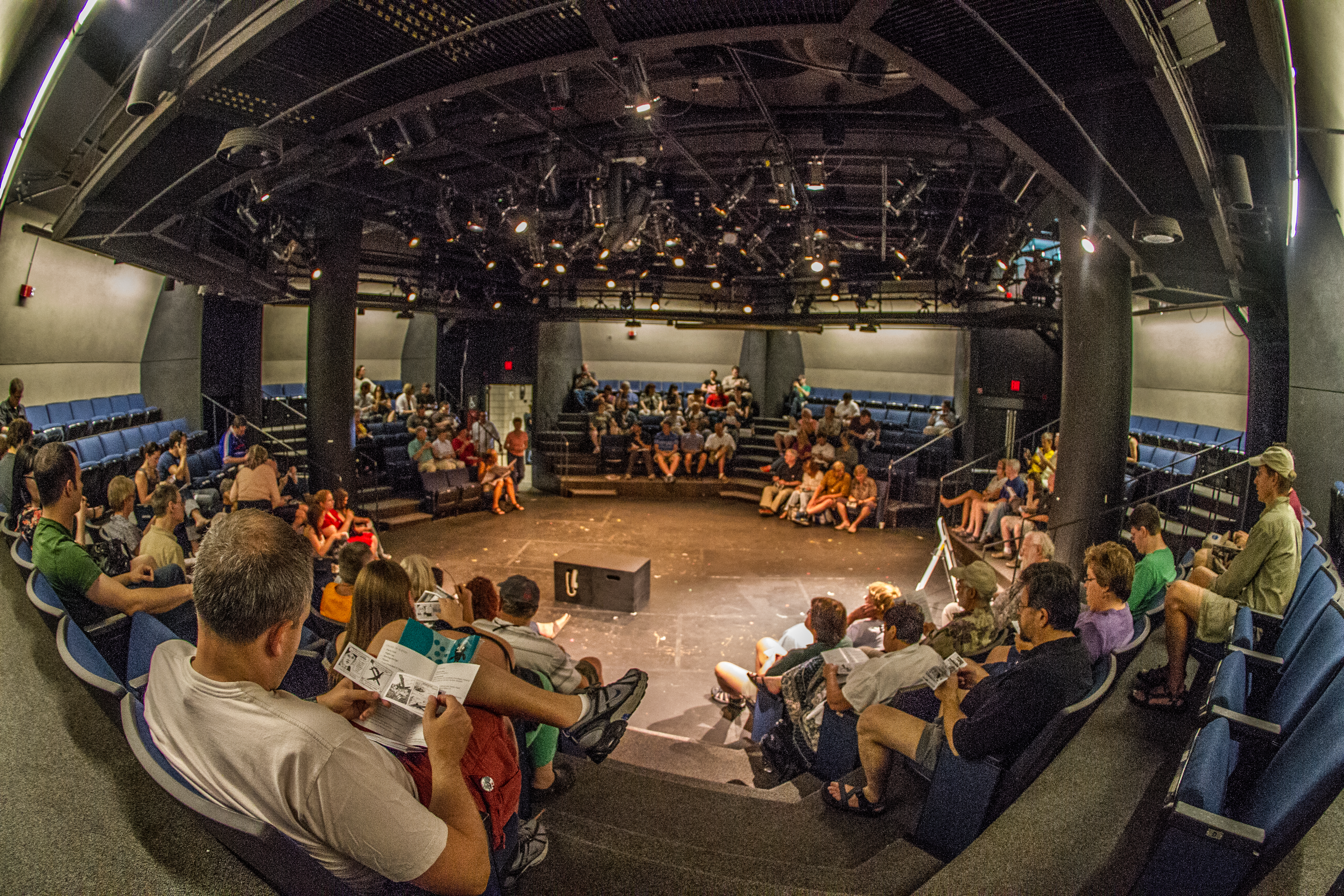
The stage of Theatre in the Round Players during the Minnesota Fringe Festival

Parts of an under-stage machinery dating from 1885, which made it possible to move people and stage designs

Stagecraft began to be developed in England between 1576 and 1642. Theatre-in-the-round stages became popular. Public playhouses such as the Globe Theatre used rigging housed in a room on the roof to lower and raise scenery or actors, and used the raised stage by developing the practice of using trap-doors in theatrical productions. Most of the theaters had a circular design, with an open area above the pit to allow sunlight to enter and illuminate the stage. Proscenium stages, or picture-box stages, were constructed in France around the time of the English Restoration. The stage combines elements of the skene in design, illuminated with candles used in footlights and in chandeliers.

Stagecraft during the Victorian era in England developed rapidly with the emergence of the West End. Prompted by an influx of urbanites in the greater London area, Parliament was forced to do away with previous licensing laws and allowed all theaters to perform straight plays in 1843. Electric lighting and hydraulics were introduced to draw large audiences to see on-stage storms, explosions, and miraculous transformations. Technologies developed during the latter part of the 19th-century paved the way for the development of special effects to be used in film.

Lighting techniques continued to develop. In England, a form lamp using a blowpipe to heat limestone to incandescence was developed for navigation purposes. It was soon adapted to theatrical performances and the limelight became a widespread form of artificial light for theaters. To control the focus of the light onstage, a Fresnel lens was used.^{[citation needed]}

After candles, gas lighting became popular. Pipes with small openings were lit before every performance and could be dimmed by controlling the flow of gas, so long as the flame never went out. At the turn of the 20th century, many theater companies making the transition from gas to electricity installed the new system right next to the old one. This resulted in many explosions and fires due to the electricity igniting the gas lines.^{[citation needed]}

=== Modern stagecraft ===
Modern theatrical lighting is electrically-based. Many lamps and lighting instruments are in use today, and the field is rapidly becoming one of the most diverse and complex in the industry.

== Sub-disciplines ==
Stagecraft comprises many disciplines, typically divided into a number of main disciplines:

- Lighting and lighting design, which involves the process of determining the angle, size, intensity, shape, and color of light for a given scene as well as hanging, focusing, procurement, and maintenance of lighting and special effects equipment, and aspects of show control.
- Makeup/wigs: The application of makeup and wigs to accentuate an actor's features.
- Mechanics: Design, engineering and operation of Flown scenery or flying of performers and mechanized scenic elements and special effects.
- Production, which includes stage management, production management, show control, house management, and company management
- Scenery, which includes set design, set construction, scenic painting, theater drapes and stage curtains, and special effects.
- Sound design, which can include musical underscoring, vocal and instrument mixing as well as theatrical sound effects. The sound designer is also responsible for the system design and build.
- Theatrical property, or props, which includes furnishings, set dressings, and all items large and small which cannot be classified as scenery, electrics, or wardrobe. Some crossover may apply. Props handled by actors are known as hand props, and props which are kept in an actor's costume are known as personal props.
- Wardrobe: costume design, construction, procurement, and maintenance.
- Video (or Projection) is a relatively recent field of stagecraft which is gaining recognition. As well as being a discipline in itself, its role may also be taken on by the Lighting or Scenery disciplines.
- Stage automation: is the use and control of moving electronics that have the ability to move set pieces, set dressings and stage floor among many other stage elements. Stage automation may also include rigging when a motor is used to control lines or objects.

== See also ==
- Association of British Theatre Technicians
- International Alliance of Theatrical Stage Employees, a labor union serving the interests of professional stagehands
- Professional Lighting and Sound Association (PLASA), UK
- Running crew
- Samuel James Hume, organizer of the first exhibition of stagecraft in the US
- Sound stage
- Technical rehearsal
- Technical week
- United Scenic Artists, a labor union that represents professional designers in the entertainment industry
- United States Institute for Theatre Technology
