= Stage (theatre) =

Designated space for the performance of productions

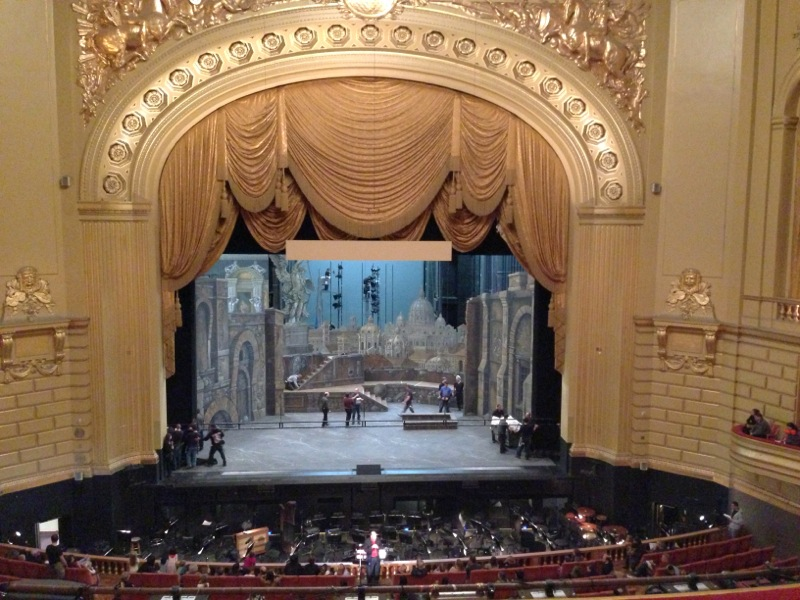
Stage of the War Memorial Opera House in San Francisco

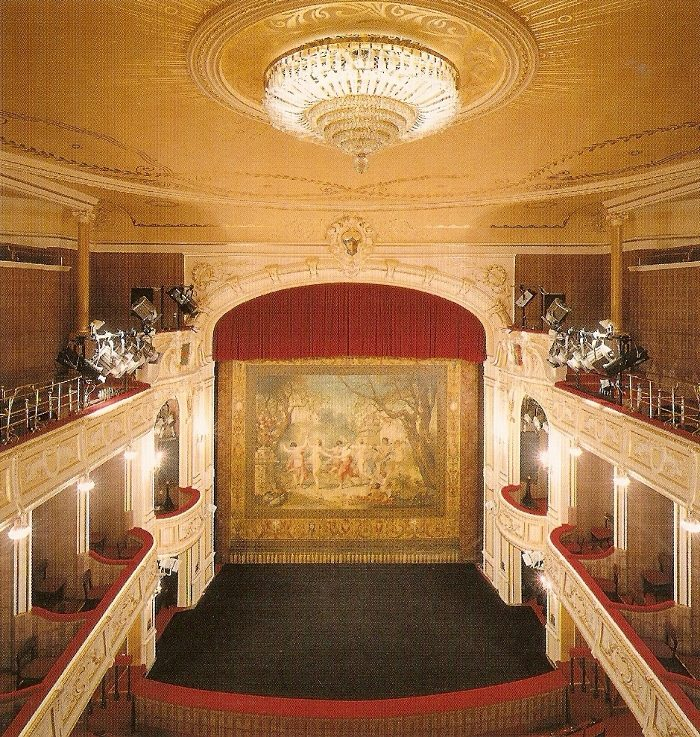
Stage of the Polish Theatre in Bielsko-Biała

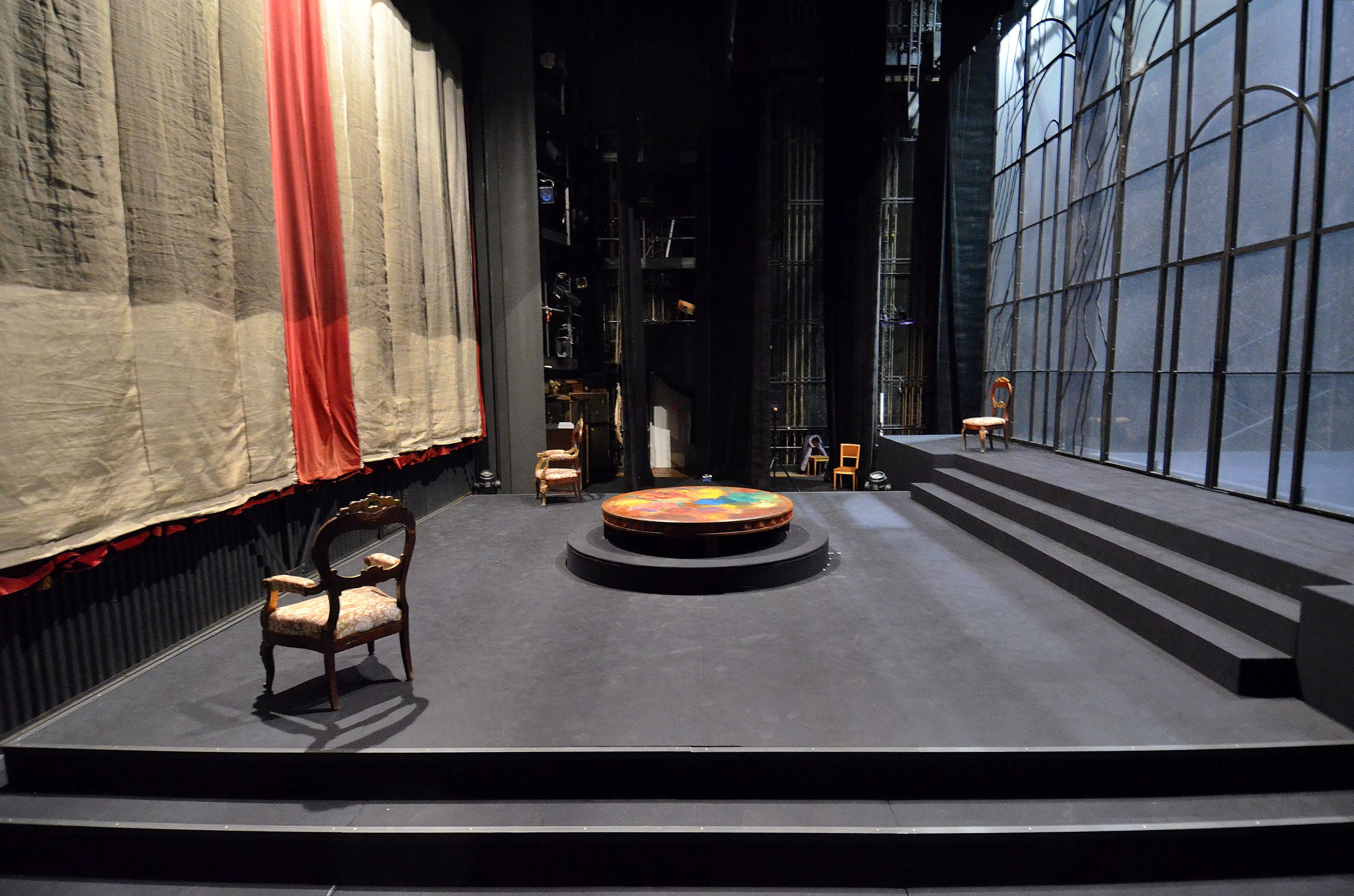
Stage of the Polish Theatre, Warsaw

In theatre and performing arts, the stage (sometimes referred to as the deck in stagecraft) is a designated space for the performance of productions. The stage serves as a space for actors or performers and a focal point (the screen in cinema theaters) for the audience. As an architectural feature, the stage may consist of a platform (often raised) or series of platforms. In some cases, these may be temporary or adjustable but in theaters and other buildings devoted to such productions, the stage is often a permanent feature.

There are several types of stages that vary as to the usage and the relation of the audience to them. The most common form found in the West is the proscenium stage. In this type, the audience is located on one side of the stage with the remaining sides hidden and used by the performers and technicians. Thrust stages may be similar to proscenium stages but with a platform or performance area that extends into the audience space so that the audience is located on three sides. In theatre in the round, the audience is located on all four sides of the stage. The fourth type of stage incorporates created and found stages which may be constructed specifically for a performance or may involve a space that is adapted as a stage.

== Types of staging ==
=== Proscenium stage ===
Since the Italian Renaissance, the most common stage used in the West has been the proscenium stage which may also be referred to as a picture frame stage. The primary feature is a large opening known as the proscenium arch through which the audience views the performance. The audience directly faces the stage—which is typically raised several feet above front row audience level—and views only one side of the scene. This one side is commonly known as the invisible fourth wall of the scene. The proscenium arch evolved from the proskenium in Ancient Greek theaters. This was the space in front of the skênê or backdrop where the actors actually played.

The first indoor theatres were created in French tennis courts and Italian Renaissance palaces where the newly embraced principles of perspective allowed designers to create stunning vistas with buildings and trees decreasing in size toward a "vanishing point" on the horizon. Stage floors were raked upward slightly from front to back in order to contribute to the perspective illusion and also to make actors more visible to audiences, who were seated on level floors. Subsequently, audience seating was raked, and balconies were added to give audiences a fuller view. By the end of the 19th century, most stages had level floors, and much of the audience looked down on, rather than up to, the stage.

The competition among royals to produce elegant and elaborate entertainments fueled and financed the expansion of European court theatres. The proscenium—which often was extremely decorative in the manner of a triumphal arch—"framed" the prospective picture. The desire of court painters to show more than one of their perspective backgrounds led court architects to adapt the pin-rails and pulleys of sailing ships to the unrolling, and later to the lowering and raising, of canvas backdrops. A wood (and later steel) grid above the stage supported pulleys from which wooden battens, and later steel pipes, rolled down, or descended, with attached scenery pieces. The weight of heavy pieces was counterbalanced by sandbags. This system required the creation of a storage stage house or loft that was usually as high or higher than the proscenium itself. A "full-fly" stage could store the entire height of scenery above the visible stage using the pin-rails before or during performance, whereas a "half-fly" stage (common in smaller locations) could only store props of limited size and thus required more careful backdrop and scenery design. Theatres using these rope systems, which are manually operated by stagehands, are known as hemp houses. They have been largely supplanted by counterweight fly systems.

The proscenium, in conjunction with stage curtains called legs, conceals the sides of the stage, which are known as the wings. The wings may be used by theatre personnel during performances and as storage spaces for scenery and props. Several rows of short curtains across the top of the stage, called teasers, hide the backdrops, which in turn are hidden above the stage in the fly system loft until ready for use.

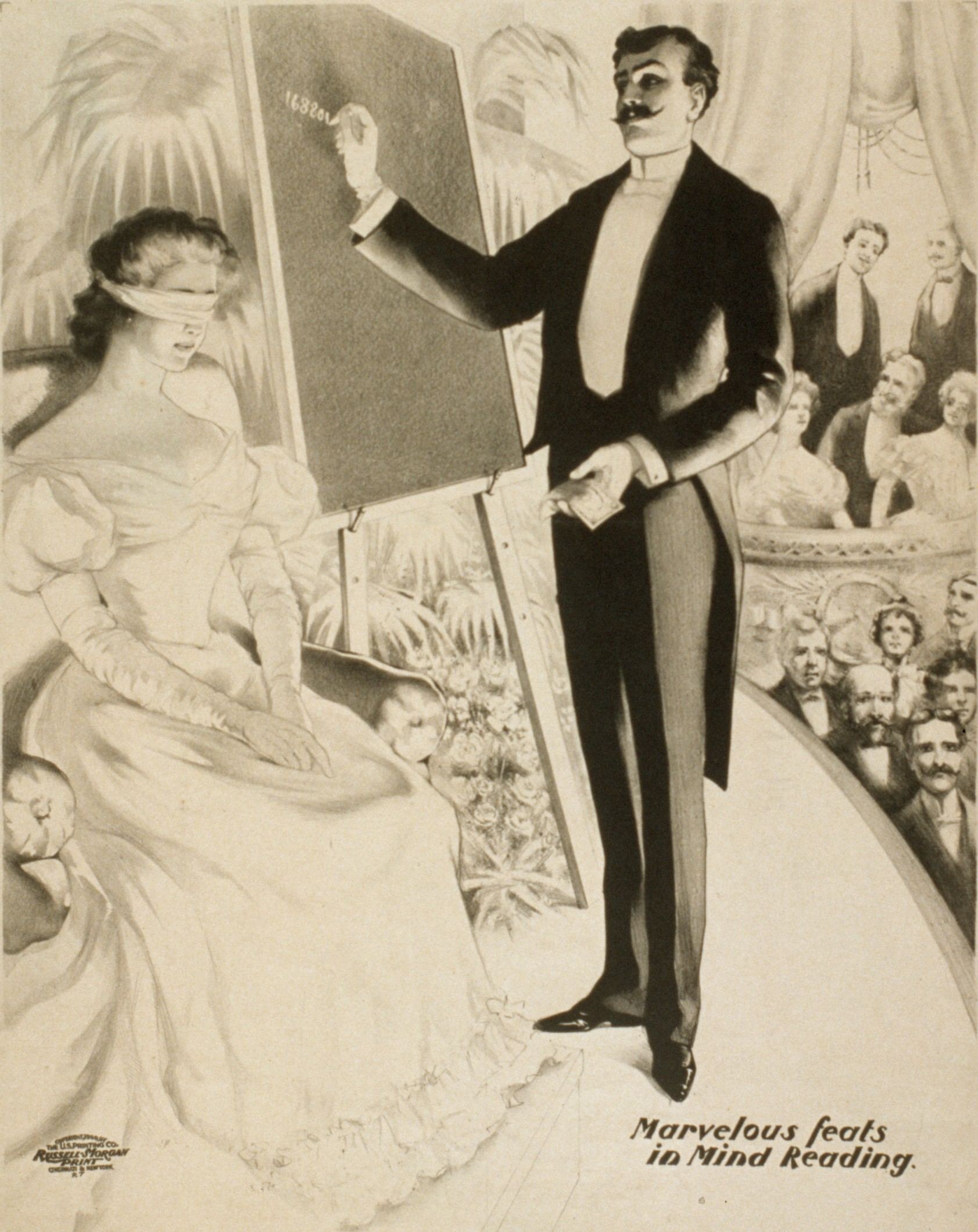
A mentalist on a stage apron in a mind-reading performance, 1900

Often, a stage may extend in front of the proscenium arch which offers additional playing area to the actors. This area is referred to as the apron. Underneath and in front of the apron is sometimes an orchestra pit which is used by musicians during musicals and operas. The orchestra pit may sometimes be covered and used as an additional playing space in order to bring the actors closer to the audience. The stage is often raised higher than the audience. Space above some proscenium stages may include a flyloft where curtains, scenery, and battens supporting a variety of lighting instruments may hang.

The multiple advantages of the proscenium stage have led to its popularity in the West. A number of theatrical properties and scenery may be utilized. Backdrops, curtains and lighting can be used to greater effect without risk of rigging being visible to the audience. Entrances and exits can be made more graceful; surprise becomes possible. The actors only have to concentrate on playing to the audience in one direction.

Boxes are a feature of more modern stage designs in which temporary walls are built inside any proscenium stage, at a slight angle to the original walls, in order to allow audience members located to the left or right of the proscenium (the further out, the larger the angle) to see the entirety of the stage. They enable "rat runs" around the back of the stage, when cast members have to move between exits and entrances without being seen by the audience.

=== Theatre in the round ===
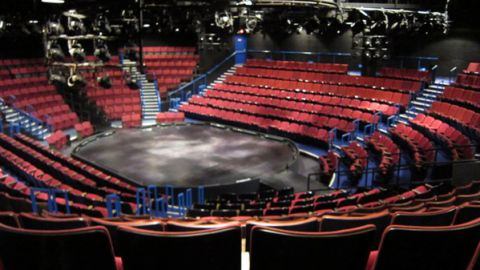
The Circle in the Square Theatre in New York City

This type of stage is located in the centre of the audience, with the audience facing it from all sides. The audience is placed close to the action, which provides a feeling of intimacy and involvement. Entrances and exits of characters from the stage, if any, must be through the audience or from under or above the stage.

In-the-round stages require special considerations in production, such as:

- Scenery that does not obscure actors and the rest of the stage from parts of the audience.
- Backdrops and curtains cannot be used, thus the director must find other ways to set the scene.
- Lighting design is more difficult than for a proscenium stage, since the actor must be lit from all sides without blinding nearby audience members.
- Entrances and exits must be made either through the audience, making surprise entrances difficult, or via closed-off walkways, which must be inconspicuous. As a result, stage entrances are normally in the corners of the theatre.
- The actors need to ensure that they do not have their backs turned to any part of the audience for long periods of time, in order to be seen and heard clearly.

=== Thrust stage ===
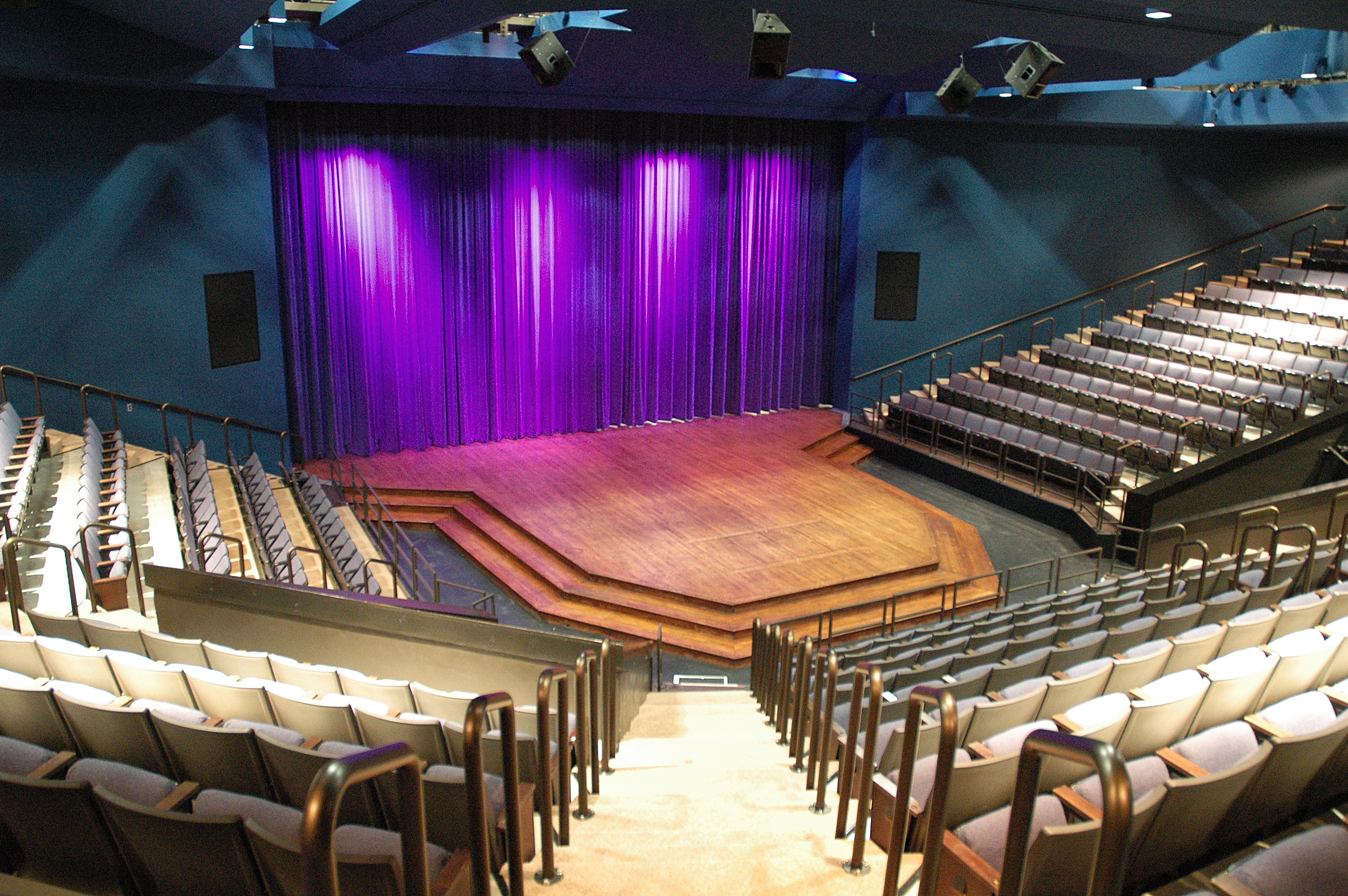
A thrust stage at the Pasant Theatre

A thrust stage is one that extends into the audience on three sides and is connected to the backstage area by its upstage end. A thrust has the benefit of greater intimacy between the audience and performers than a proscenium while retaining the utility of a backstage area. Entrances onto a thrust are most readily made from backstage, although some theatres provide for performers to enter through the audience using vomitory entrances.

As with an arena, the audience in a thrust stage theatre may view the stage from three or more sides. If a performance employs the fourth wall, that imaginary wall must be maintained on multiple sides. Similar to theatre in the round, the audience can view the performance from a variety of perspectives, and as such it is usual for the blocking, props and scenery to receive thorough consideration to ensure that no perspective is blocked from view. A high backed chair, for instance, when placed stage right, could create a blind spot in the stage left action.

=== Mansion stage ===
A mansion stage is one that is a small wooden platform with supports and a roof, commonly used in medieval theatre to represent specific locations (such as Heaven or Hell). The actors would move between these mansions as the play demanded. The acting area of the stage was called the platea, and mansions were placed around the platea. As the actors moved between the mansions, the platea would take on the scenic identity of each mansion. In England, pageant wagons were used for cycle dramas to hold the mansion, the platea, and a dressing area. These wagons moved the scene from one audience to the next, unlike in the church where mansions were stationary and both performers and the congregation moved from mansion to mansion.

=== Black box ===
A black box theater consists of a simple yet somewhat unadorned performance space, ideally a large square room with black walls and a flat floor, which can be used flexibly to create a stage and audience area.

=== Created and found spaces ===
A stage can also be improvised wherever a suitable space can be found. Examples may include staging a performance in a non traditional space such as a basement of a building, a side of a hill or, in the case of a busking troupe, the street. In a similar manner, a makeshift stage can be created by modifying an environment. For example, demarcating the boundaries of a stage in an open space by laying a carpet and arranging seating before it. The theater company Shakespeare In The Park, in fact, is based around performing Shakespeare plays in a space that one wouldn't likely find it, namely, Central Park in New York City.

Outdoor theatre at The Mount, West Bay, Dorset in the early 20th century

== Stage terminology ==
House right/left are from the audience's perspective

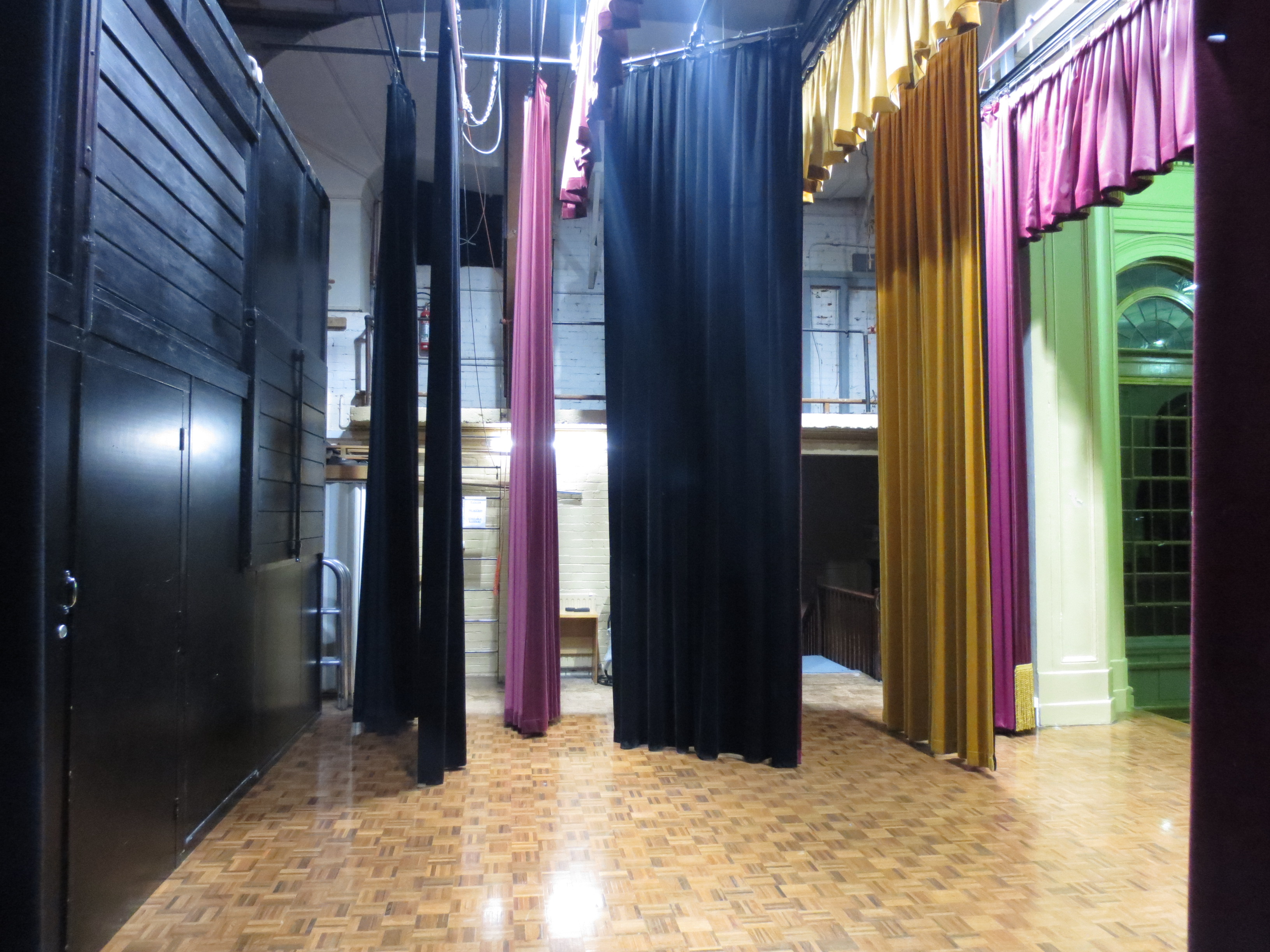
View from stage right across stage to stage left. Typical small stage (Albert Hall, Canberra) (2016)

Areas of the stage are assigned names to facilitate blocking, the setting out of the precise movement and positioning of actors on a stage.

To an actor facing the audience, left and right are the reverse of what they are for the audience. To prevent confusion, actors and directors never use the unmarked terms left or right for the sides of the stage. Rather, they use a phrase specifying the viewpoint. The terms stage left and stage right, respectively, denote the sides of the stage that are on the actor's left and right when the actor is facing the audience, while house left and house right are the reverse, denoting the sides of the stage as viewed by the audience. In Germany, stage right and left are reversed, being the director's view rather than the actor's.

Less ambiguous terms used in theatres that follow a British tradition are prompt side or P side (stage left) and off-prompt, opposite prompt or O.P. side (stage right), relating to the traditional location of the stage manager. In French, the terms côté cour (square side) for stage left and côté jardin (garden side) for stage right are used, in reference to the Théâtre des Tuileries.

Likewise, the meaning of front and back would be unclear because they depend on perspective. Instead, the term upstage is used to denote the part of the stage furthest from the audience or to motion away from the audience, while downstage denotes the portion of the stage closest to the audience or to motion in that direction. These terms were common in older theatres, which gave the audience a better view of the action by inclining the floor (known as a raked stage), so upstage actually was at a higher elevation than downstage.

A raked stage can vary in its incline; ten degrees is considered ideal for the audience and actor comfort. A dancing surface incline is often different from an acting incline and can vary from three degrees to twenty degrees.

== Scenographic theory ==
In relationship to approaches to scenography, cultural scenographer Rachel Hann has proposed that there "are no stages without scenographics". This is based on an argument that "all stages are also scenes", which challenges the "deterministic assumption that stages precede scenography". In this model, stages become manifest through the place orientating traits of scenographics (rather than the other way around). The implications of this are that all theatre is scenographic – even if it has no defined objects or 'setting' – as all theatre is performed on a stage. Hann summarises this position by using the hybrid 'stage-scene' when discussing the tensions between the histories of these practices, particularly with reference to original Greek skene as a physical tent or hut that ultimately shaped current conceptualizations of 'the stage'.

== See also ==
- Noh § Stage, classical Japanese theater
