= Medieval theatre =

Theatrical performances in the Middle Ages

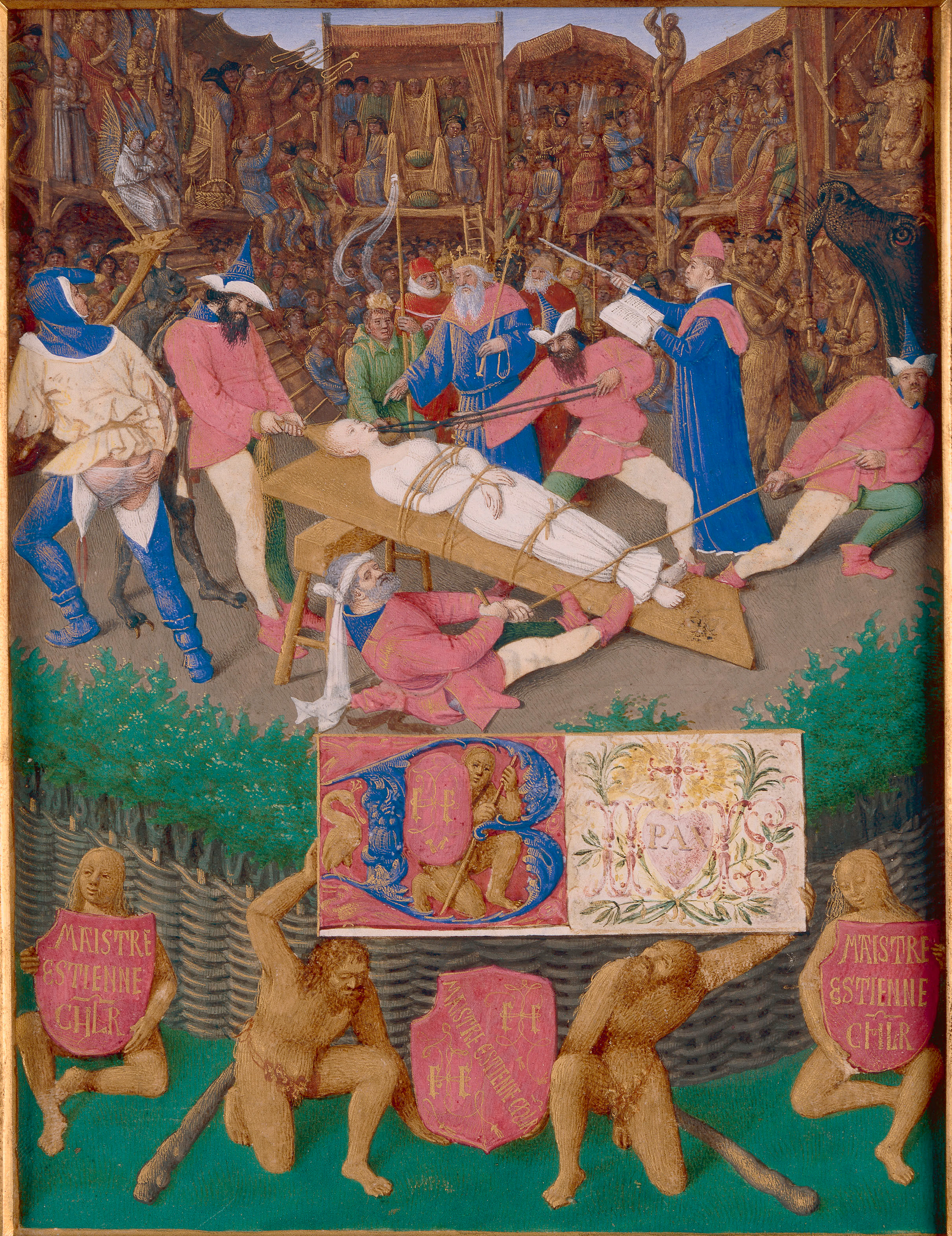
Jean Fouquet, The Martyrdom of Saint Apollonia

Medieval theatre encompasses theatre in the period between the fall of the Western Roman Empire in the 5th century and the beginning of the Renaissance in approximately the 15th century. The category of "medieval theatre" is vast, covering dramatic performance in Europe over a thousand-year period. A broad spectrum of genres needs to be considered, including mystery plays, morality plays, farces and masques. The themes were almost always religious. The most famous examples are the English cycle dramas, the York Mystery Plays, the Chester Mystery Plays, the Wakefield Mystery Plays, and the N-Town Plays, as well as the morality play known as Everyman. One of the first surviving secular plays in English is The Interlude of the Student and the Girl (c. 1300).

Due to a lack of surviving records and texts, low literacy in the general population, and the opposition of the clergy, there are few surviving sources from the Early and High Medieval periods. However, by the late period, performances began to become more secularized; larger number of records survive.

== Difficulty of finding appropriate terms ==
Because contemporary conceptions about theatre differ radically from the performance culture of the pre-modern world, it is difficult to find appropriate terms. First, "medieval" denotes a time period (500–1500) far too large and complex to understand in short descriptions. And within it, there was "a vast and varied spectrum of kinds of performances: ludus, jeu, ordo, representatio, officium, pagina, miraculum, mystère, processus, interlude, morality, mumming, disguising, and, of course, play." These had little to do with stage performance in the 21st century.

== Transition from Rome, 500–900 A.D. ==
As the Western Roman Empire fell into severe decay through the 4th and 5th centuries A.D., the seat of Roman power shifted to Constantinople and the Eastern Roman Empire, later called the Byzantine Empire. While surviving evidence about Byzantine theatre is slight, existing records show that mime, pantomime, scenes or recitations from tragedies and comedies, dances, and other entertainments were very popular. Constantinople had two theatres that were in use as late as the 6th century A.D. However, the true importance of the Byzantines in theatrical history is their preservation of many classical Greek texts and the compilation of a massive encyclopedia called the Suda, from which is derived a large amount of contemporary information on Greek theatre. In 526 AD, Emperor Justinian withdrew state support and funding from the theatres, which resulted in the Hippodrome of Constantinople being the only remaining venue for theatre plays; the wife of the Emperor Justinian, the Empress Theodora, performed at the Hippodrome prior to her marriage. This development were the same in provincial cities, were "mime performances" were now only noted at the city arena between the races, as well as actors and artist being hired for private performances in people's homes.

The decrees in of 691–692 by Justinian II were aimed at eradicating all remains of Pagan customs and pre-Christians rites: the Canon 51 banned mimes, pantomimes and wild animal shows, and the Canon 62 banned pre-Christian rites, such as 1 March when women danced in public, as well as men dressing as women and women dressing as men and the wearing of comic, tragic or satyric masks. After the 690s acting was formally banned in the Byzantine Empire. However it appeared acting still continued clandestinly and tolerated in some circumstances despite the decree. In the comment of Balsamon from the 12th century he pointed out that the acting once banned was not the same as the acting that now took place on the emperor's pleasure, which indicate that acting still occurred; and performances of "mime artists" are noted to have taken place at the Hippodrome in the carnivals of 1118 and 1168.

Theatres were considered by many to be a diabolical threat to Christianity, especially because new converts continued to attend. Church fathers such as Tatian, Tertullian and Augustine characterized the stage as an instrument of corruption, while acting was considered sinful because its imitation of life was considered a mockery of God's creation. Roman actors were forbidden to have contact with Christian women, own slaves, or wear gold. They were officially excommunicated, denied the sacraments, including marriage and burial, and were defamed throughout Europe. For many centuries thereafter, clerics were cautioned to not allow travelling actors to perform in their jurisdiction.

Hrosvitha (c. 935–973), an aristocratic canoness and historian in northern Germany, wrote six plays modeled on Terence's comedies but using religious subjects in the 10th century. These six plays are the first known plays composed by a female dramatist and the first identifiable Western dramatic works of the post-Classical era. In order to preempt criticism from the Church, Hrosvitha declared that she sought to imitate the "laudable" deeds of women in Terence's plays and discard the "shameless" ones. They were first published in 1501 and had considerable influence in the sixteenth century. Another nun who wrote plays was the abbess Hildegard of Bingen (d. 1179), who wrote a drama called Ordo Virtutum in 1155.

The origins of Italian theatre are a source of debate among scholars, as they are not yet clear and traceable with certain sources. Since the end of the theatre of ancient Rome, which partly coincided with the fall of the Western Roman Empire, mimes and comedies were still performed. Alongside this pagan form of representation, mostly performed by tropes and wandering actors of which there are no direct written sources, the theatre was reborn, in medieval times, from religious functions and from the dramatization of some tropes of which the most famous and ancient is the short Quem quaeritis? from the 10th century, still in Latin.

It can therefore be assumed that there were two main lines on which the ancient Italian theatre developed. The first, consisting of the dramatization of Catholic liturgies and of which more documentation is retained, and the second, formed by pagan forms of spectacle such as the staging for city festivals, the court preparations of the jesters and the songs of the troubadours.

== Early Medieval theatre ==
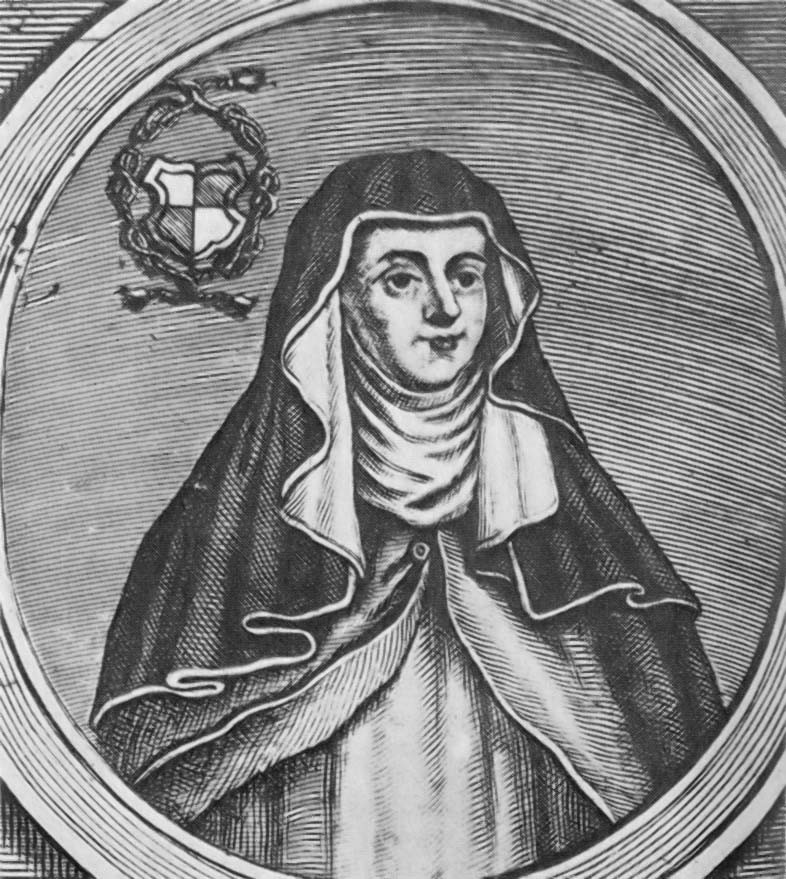
Hrosvitha of Gandersheim, the first dramatist of the post-classical era.

From the 5th century, Western Europe was plunged into a period of general disorder that lasted (with a brief period of stability under the Carolingian Empire in the 9th century) until the 10th century. As such, most organized theatrical activities disappeared in Western Europe. While it seems that small nomadic bands travelled around Europe throughout the period, performing wherever they could find an audience, there is no evidence that they produced anything but crude scenes. These performers were denounced by the Church during the Dark Ages as they were viewed as dangerous and pagan.

Faced with the problem of explaining a new religion to a largely illiterate population, churches in the Early Middle Ages began staging dramatized versions of particular biblical events on specific days of the year. The dramatizations were included in order to vivify annual celebrations. Symbolic objects and actions (vestments, altars, censers, and pantomime performed by priests) recalled the events which Christian ritual celebrates. The Whom do you Seek (Quem-Quaeritis) Easter trope, dating from ca. 925, is an example of performing the events surround Christ's empty grave. The text was sung responsively by two groups and was not considered to be "acting" in the sense of impersonation. Sometime between 965 and 975, Æthelwold of Winchester composed the Regularis Concordia (Monastic Agreement) which contains a playlet complete with directions for performance.

The anonymous pagan play Querolus, written around 420, was adapted in the 12th century by Vitalis of Blois. Other secular Latin plays, such as Babio, were also written in the 12th century, mainly in France but also in England. It is also known that mimes, minstrels, bards, storytellers, and jugglers travelled in search of new audiences and financial support. Not much is known about these performers' repertoire. One of the most famous of the secular plays is the musical Le Jeu de Robin et Marion, written by Adam de la Halle in the 13th century, which is fully laid out in the original manuscript with lines, musical notation, and illuminations in the margins depicting the actors in motion. Adam also wrote other plays.

Hrosvitha (c. 935 – 973), a canoness in northern Germany, wrote six plays modeled on Terence's comedies but using religious subjects. These six plays – Abraham, Callimachus, Dulcitius, Gallicanus, Paphnutius, and Sapientia – are the first known plays composed by a female dramatist and the first identifiable Western dramatic works of the post-classical era. They were first published in 1501 and had considerable influence on religious and didactic plays of the sixteenth century. Hrosvitha was followed by Hildegard of Bingen (d. 1179), a Benedictine abbess, who wrote a Latin musical drama called Ordo Virtutum in 1155.

== High and Late Medieval theatre ==
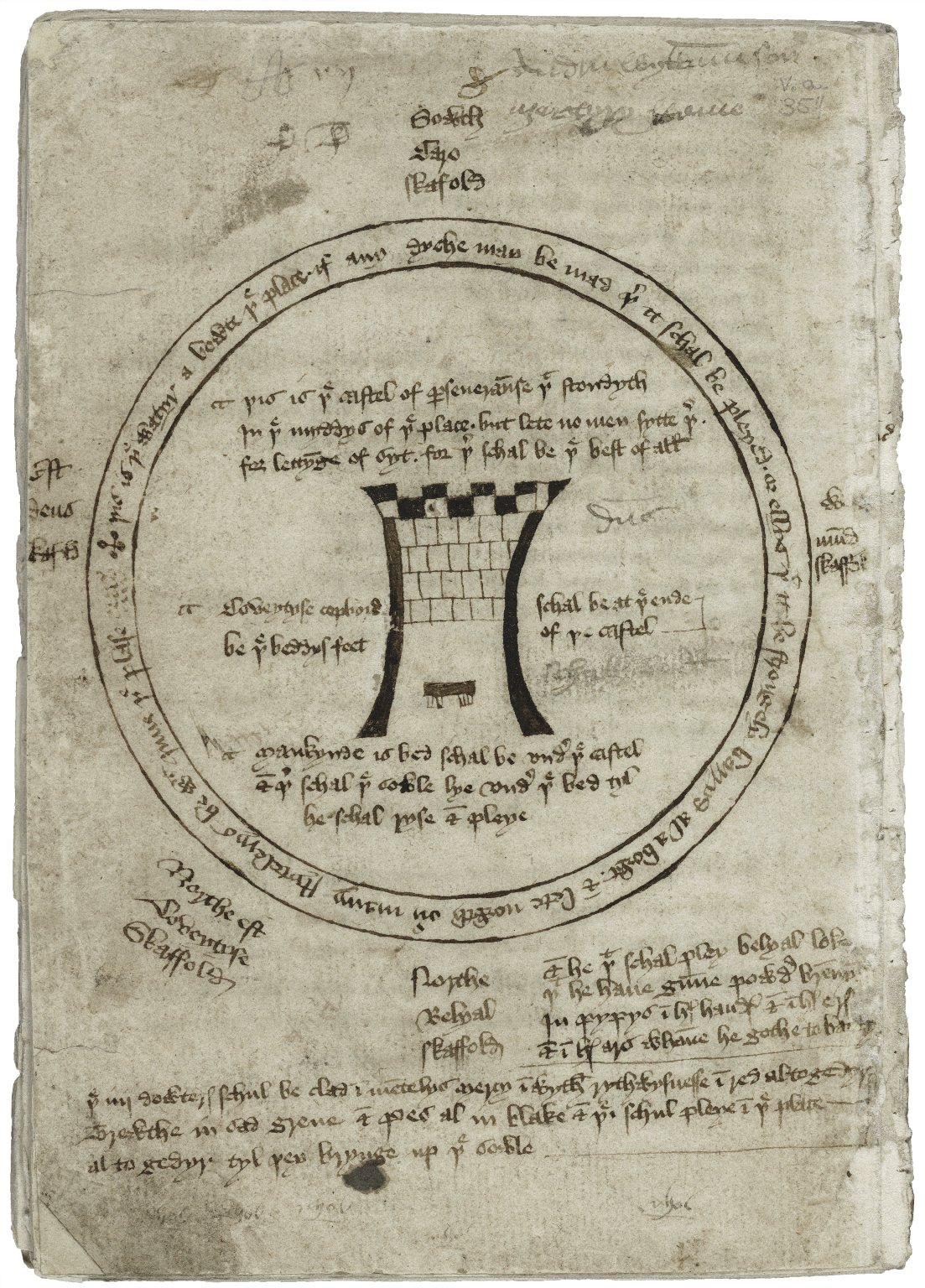
Stage drawing from 15th–century vernacular morality play The Castle of Perseverance (as found in the Macro Manuscript).

As the Viking invasions ceased in the middle of the 11th century, liturgical drama had spread from Russia to Scandinavia to Italy. Only in Muslim-occupied Iberian Peninsula were liturgical dramas not presented at all. Despite the large number of liturgical dramas that have survived from the period, many churches would have only performed one or two per year and a larger number never performed any at all.

The Feast of Fools was especially important in the development of comedy. The festival inverted the status of the lesser clergy and allowed them to ridicule their superiors and the routine of church life. Sometimes plays were staged as part of the occasion and a certain amount of burlesque and comedy crept into these performances. Although comic episodes had to truly wait until the separation of drama from the liturgy, the Feast of Fools undoubtedly had a profound effect on the development of comedy in both religious and secular plays.

Performance of religious plays outside of the church began sometime in the 12th century through a traditionally accepted process of merging shorter liturgical dramas into longer plays. These plays were then translated into vernacular and performed by laymen on stages known as mansion stages. The Play of Adam (1150) gives credence to this theory as its detailed stage direction suggest that it was performed outdoors. A number of other plays from the period survive, including La Seinte Resurrection (Norman), The Play of the Magi Kings (Spanish), and Sponsus (French).

The importance of the High Middle Ages in the development of theatre was the economic and political changes that led to the formation of guilds and the growth of towns. This would lead to significant changes in the Late Middle Ages. In the British Isles, plays were produced in some 127 different towns during the Middle Ages. These vernacular Mystery plays were written in cycles of a large number of plays: York (48 plays), Chester (24), Wakefield (32) and Unknown (42). A larger number of plays survive from France and Germany in this period and some type of religious dramas were performed in nearly every European country in the Late Middle Ages. Many of these plays contained comedy, devils, villains and clowns.

The theatre historian therefore based his research method, in the field of the origins of Italian theatre, not only on the actual study of his own subject but also combining it with ethnological and anthropological study as well as that of religious studies in a broad sense.

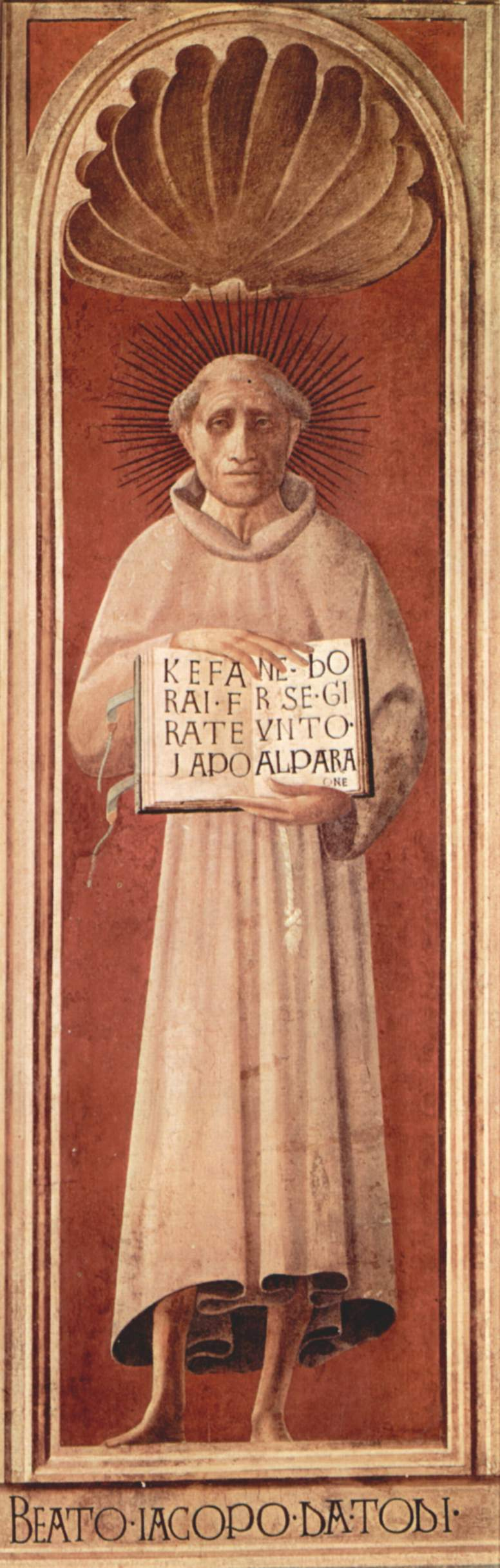
Jacopone da Todi in a fresco by Paolo Uccello in the cathedral of Prato

The Catholic Church, which found in the dramatization of the liturgies a more than favorable welcome from the masses, as demonstrated by the development of theatrical practice on major holidays, paradoxically had a contradictory behavior towards them: if on the one hand it allowed and encouraged their diffusion, however he always deprecated its practice, because it was misleading from the principles of Catholicism. The pagan spectacles suffered the same fate, where the judgments and measures taken by the religious were much harsher: still in 1215, a Constitution of the Lateran Council forbade clerics (among other things) to have contact with histrions and jugglers. The strong contrast of religious authority to theatrical practice decreed a series of circumstances that differentiate medieval theatre (which still cannot be defined as "Italian" in the strict sense) from that known from Humanism onwards, much closer to the modern concept of theatrical representation. For over ten centuries there was never the construction of a theatrical building, unlike what happened in ancient Greece and imperial Rome.

Despite the numerous restrictions, the vernacular dramaturgy develops due to the trouvères and jesters, who sing, lute in hand, the most disparate topics: from love driven towards women to mockery towards the powerful. There is evidence in the Laurentian Rhythm of 1157 and in other more or less contemporary rhythms such as the Rhythm of Sant'Alessio, of the dramatization in verse by anonymous people in the vernacular, although the metric is still indebted to the Latin versification. More famous is the XIII century Rosa fresca aulentissima, by Cielo d'Alcamo, a real jester mime destined for stage representation, which does not spare double entenders and overly licentious jokes towards the fair sex in verses.

Even more articulated were the texts of Ruggieri Apuliese, a jester of the 13th century of which there is little or no news, mostly discordant, but in which a sardonic ability can be traced to parody and dramatize the events, enclosed in his gab and serventesi. During the 13th century, however, the jester prose in the vernacular suffered a setback due to the marginalization of the events to which it was linked: representations in Curta, street performances, and more of which the chronicle does not remember.

The lauda dramatica flourished in the same period, which later evolved into the sacred representation: the lauda, derived from the popular ballad, was made up of stanzas represented first in verse, then in the form of dialogue. An example of transformation into a dialogic drama is a result of Donna de Paradiso by Jacopone da Todi, where the dialogue between John the Baptist, the Mary and Jesus is articulated on a religious topic: in it there is a fine linguistic and lexical intervention (the subdued language of the Mary and Christ compared to that of the John the Baptist) and a skilful capacity for dramatizing the event. It should be emphasized that this type of religious theatricality did not properly spread within the Church, but developed above all in Umbria following a serious plague that decimated the country, due to the Flagellant, congregations of faithful used to self-flagellation, which by virtue of their religious acts they well combined the processions of repentance with accompaniment with dramatic laudi. If they found representation in Orvieto, as in other Umbrian centers (remember the famous Corporal of Bolsena), another important epicenter of laude productions was L'Aquila, where the articulation of the same was such as to require three days for a complete representation (as in the case of the anonymous Leggenna de Sancto Tomascio).

The majority of actors in these plays were drawn from the local population. For example, at Valenciennes in 1547, more than 100 roles were assigned to 72 actors. Plays were staged on pageant wagon stages, which were platforms mounted on wheels used to move scenery. The amateurs often provided their own costumes. The platform stage, which was an unidentified space and not a specific locale, allowed for abrupt changes in location.

The amateurs engaged to perform in religious plays were typically drawn from their sponsoring church congregations, and the common thing was to engaged men to perform also the female parts. However, women were not explicitly banned and there were cases in which women were appointed to play. Amateur performers in England were exclusively male, but other countries had female performers. In 1514, for example, women were engaged to perform all the female roles in the Bozen Passion Play in the city of Bolzano.

A separate chapter with respect to religious representation consists of those productions in Latin verse known as elegiac comedies (medieval Latin comedies). It is a set of Medieval Latin texts, mainly composed of the metric form of the elegiac couplet and characterized, almost always, by the alternation of dialogues and narrated parts and by comic and licentious contents.

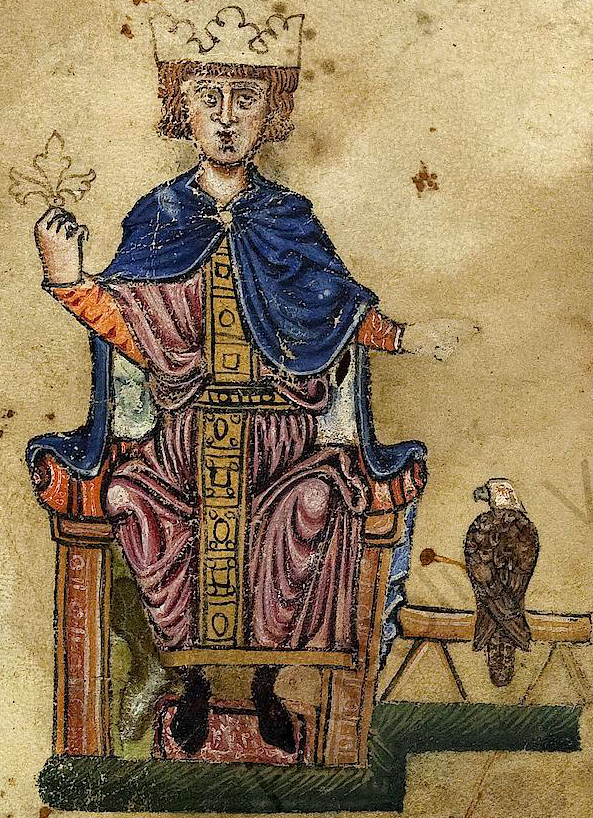
Frederick II, Holy Roman Emperor

The flowering of the genus is mainly inscribed within the European season of the so-called rebirth of the 12th century and is affected by the ferment of that cultural climate that the philologist Ludwig Traube called Aetas Ovidiana. as a whole, it was a phenomenon that certainly cannot be affirmed as Italian: on the contrary, Italy was just touched by this phenomenon, in a later period, the thirteenth century: all Italian productions refer to the environment of the court and chancellery of Frederick II, Holy Roman Emperor (the singular De Paulino et Polla by Riccardo da Venosa, and the De uxore cerdonis, attributed to Jacopo da Benevento).

However, their genuine theatrical nature is not clear: it is not known, for example, if they were mere rhetorical products or rather works intended for a real staging (in this case, acting with a single voice is considered more likely); not even one is able to appreciate the influence on the rise of medieval theatre in the vernacular, even if some comic elements have passed to the theatre. The small flowering of this genus enjoyed considerable success; its importance in literary history is noteworthy, due to its influence on subsequent authors in vulgar languages, in particular on medieval fabliaulistics and novellistics of which they anticipate themes and tones, and on humanistic comedy of the fifteenth century.

Throughout the Middle Ages, no theatrical building was ever constructed. This has made it difficult for historians to study the theatrical architecture. Regarding the scenography, it can be completely placed on the level of sacred representations, since jesters and buffoons, troubadours, and singers did not use support elements that could help the spectator in the figuration of the story narrated. The almost nil iconographic support that has come makes a faithful reconstruction difficult, but the lists of the Brotherhood "stuff" have allowed historians to attribute a wealth of furnishings not comparable to the modern conception of theatre but still of a certain thickness: the list of the Perugian brotherhood of Saint Dominic is very well known, where you can find shirts, gloves, cassocks, wigs and masks.

The representations, which came out of the church in search of larger places of reception and where there was the possibility of using scenic artists certainly not welcome within consecrated walls, found a place in the churchyards first, in the squares and then even in the streets of the city, both in the form of a procession that does not. The pictorial support, which was necessary for a more complete recognition of the place represented and narrated, also became very important, although no names of artists who worked for their realization have come down to us. It must be borne in mind that there is no figure of set-up or set designer, so such works necessarily had to submit to the requests of the brotherhoods, and almost certainly carried out by untrained artists or of little fame given that the possible gain was little.

Morality plays emerged as a distinct dramatic form around 1400 and flourished until 1550. The earliest full-length morality play is The Castle of Perseverance which depicts mankind's progress from birth to death. However, the most famous morality play and perhaps best known medieval drama is Everyman. Everyman receives Death's summons, struggles to escape and finally resigns himself to necessity. Along the way, he is deserted by Kindred, Goods, and Fellowship – only Good Deeds goes with him to the grave.

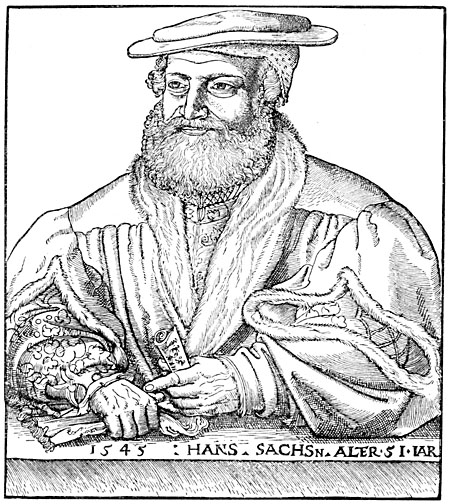
Hans Sachs, wood engraving by Michael Ostendorfer

There were also a number of secular performances staged in the Middle Ages, the earliest of which is The Play of the Greenwood by Adam de la Halle in 1276. It contains satirical scenes and folk material such as faeries and other supernatural occurrences. Farces also rose dramatically in popularity after the 13th century. The majority of these plays come from France and Germany and are similar in tone and form, emphasizing sex and bodily excretions. The best known playwright of farces is Hans Sachs (1494–1576) who wrote 198 dramatic works. In England, The Second Shepherds' Play of the Wakefield Cycle is the best known early farce. However, farce did not appear independently in England until the 16th century with the work of John Heywood (1497–1580).

A significant forerunner of the development of Elizabethan drama was the Chambers of Rhetoric in the Low Countries. These societies were concerned with poetry, music and drama and held contests to see which society could compose the best drama in relation to a question posed.

At the end of the Late Middle Ages, professional actors began to appear in England and Europe. Richard III and Henry VII both maintained small companies of professional actors. Their plays were performed in the Great Hall of a nobleman's residence, often with a raised platform at one end for the audience and a "screen" at the other for the actors. Also important were Mummers' plays, performed during the Christmas season, and court masques. These masques were especially popular during the reign of Henry VIII who had a House of Revels built and an Office of Revels established in 1545.

The end of medieval drama came about due to a number of factors, including the weakening power of the Catholic Church, the Protestant Reformation and the banning of religious plays in many countries. Elizabeth I forbid all religious plays in 1558 and the great cycle plays had been silenced by the 1580s. Similarly, religious plays were banned in the Netherlands in 1539, the Papal States in 1547 and in Paris in 1548. The abandonment of these plays destroyed the international theatre that had thereto existed and forced each country to develop its own form of drama. It also allowed dramatists to turn to secular subjects and the reviving interest in Greek and Roman theatre provided them with the perfect opportunity.

== Changes in the Early Modern Period ==
Changing political and economic factors greatly affected theatre at the end of the Middle Ages and beginning of the Modern Era. First, the Protestant Reformation targeted the theatre, especially in England, in an effort to stamp out allegiance to Rome. In Wakefield, for example, the local mystery cycle text shows signs of Protestant editing, with references to the pope crossed out. It was not just Protestants who attacked the theatre: The Council of Trent banned religious plays in an attempt to rein in the extrabiblical material.

A revival of interest in ancient Roman and Greek culture changed the tastes of the learned classes in the performing arts. Greek and Roman plays were performed and new plays were written that were heavily influenced by the classical style. This led to the creation of Commedia dell'arte and influenced Renaissance theatre.

A change of patronage also caused drastic changes to the theatre. In England, the monarch and nobility started to support professional theatre troupes (including Shakespeare's Lord Chamberlain's Men and King's Men), which catered to their upper-class patrons' tastes.

Finally, the construction of permanent theaters, such as The Theatre, signaled a major turning point. Permanent theaters allowed for more sophisticated staging and storytelling.

== Modern productions of Medieval theatre ==
=== Mummers plays ===
Mummers plays are still performed regularly throughout the United Kingdom as well as the U.S., such as the annual Mummers Parade in Philadelphia. What relation they may bear to their medieval antecedents is unknown. The surviving texts of this oral tradition were recorded in the 18th century, at a time when the Industrial Revolution began to break up the rural communities in which the plays were performed.

=== Mystery plays ===
Mystery plays are still produced regularly throughout the United Kingdom. The local cycles were revived in both York and Chester in 1951 as part of the Festival of Britain, and are still performed by the local guilds. The N-Town cycle was revived in 1978 as the Lincoln mystery plays, and in 1994 the Lichfield Mysteries were inaugurated (now the largest community theatre event in the United Kingdom).

In 1977, the National Theatre commissioned Tony Harrison to create The Mysteries, a re-working of the Wakefield Cycle and others. It was revived in 1985 (whereupon the production was filmed for Channel 4 Television), and again as a part of the theatre's millennium celebration in 2000. The productions won Bill Bryden the "Best Director" title in both the Evening Standard Theatre Awards and the Olivier Awards for 1985, the year the three plays first appeared together in performance at the Lyceum Theatre. An adaptation of Harrison's play was staged at Shakespeare's Globe in 2011 as The Globe Mysteries.

In 2001, the Isango Ensemble produced an African version of the Chester Cycle at the Garrick Theatre in London as The Mysteries – Yiimimangaliso, performing in a combination of Xhosa, Zulu, English, Latin and Afrikaans. They revived an adapted version of the production at Shakespeare's Globe in 2015 as The Mysteries. In 2004, two mystery plays (one focusing on the Creation and the other on the Passion) were performed at Canterbury Cathedral, with actor Edward Woodward in the role of God. The large cast also included Daniel MacPherson, Thomas James Longley and Joseph McManners.

=== Morality plays ===
The first modern stage production of Everyman did not appear until July 1901, when The Elizabethan Stage Society of William Poel gave three outdoor performances at the Charterhouse in London. Poel then partnered with British actor Ben Greet to produce the play throughout Britain, with runs on the American Broadway stage from 1902 to 1918, and concurrent tours throughout North America. These productions differed from past performances in that women were cast in the title role, rather than men. Film adaptations of the 1901 version of the play appeared in 1913 and 1914, with the 1913 film being made in Kinemacolor, an early two color process.

Another well-known version of the play is Jedermann by the Austrian playwright Hugo von Hofmannsthal, which has been performed annually at the Salzburg Festival since 1920. The play was made into a film of the same title in 1961. A direct-to-video movie version of Everyman was made in 2002, directed by John Farrell, which updated the setting to the early 21st century. An adaptation by Carol Ann Duffy, the British Poet Laureate, was performed at the National Theatre (UK) in 2015 with Chiwetel Ejiofor in the title role.

=== Miracle plays ===
Performances of Christ's Nativity are frequent during the Christmas season, and many schools and Sunday school groups regularly perform scenes from the bible with children. The reenactment of Jesus Christ's Passion is performed throughout the world in Lent.

== See also ==
- Wakefield Mystery Plays
- The Second Shepherds' Play
- History of theatre
- Medieval French literature
- Carnival
- The Vice

== Sources ==
- Banham, Martin, ed. 1998. The Cambridge Guide to Theatre. Cambridge: Cambridge University Press. ISBN 0-521-43437-8.
- Bate, Keith, ed. 1976. Three Latin Comedies. Toronto: Centre for Medieval Studies.
- Brockett, Oscar G. and Franklin J. Hildy. 2003. History of the Theatre. Ninth edition, International edition. Boston: Allyn and Bacon. ISBN 0-205-41050-2.
- Cohen, Robert. 2000. Theatre: Brief Edition. Mayfield: McGraw-Hill. ISBN 978-0077333515.
- Hannant, Sara. 2011. Mummers, Maypoles and Milkmaids: A Journey Through the English Ritual Year. London: Merrell. ISBN 978-1-8589-4559-0.
- Klaus, Carl H., Miriam Gilbert, and Braford S. Field Jr. 1991. "Stages of Drama." New York: St. Martin's.
- Knight, Alan E. 1983. "Aspects of Genre in Late Medieval French Drama." Manchester University Press.
- McAlister, Linda. 1996. "Hypatia's Daughters: 1500 Years of Women Philosophers." Hypatia Inc.
- Nelson, Alan H. 1972. "Some Configurations of Staging in Medieval English Drama" Medieval English Drama: Essays Critical and Contextual Chicago: University of Chicago Press. 116–147.
- Styan, J.L. 1996. The English Stage: A History of Drama and Performance. Cambridge: Cambridge University Press. ISBN 0-521-55636-8.
- Symes, Carol. 2007. A Common Stage: Theatre and Public Life in Medieval Arras. Ithaca: Cornell University Press. ISBN 978-0801445811.
- Walsh, Martin. 2002. "Drama." Medieval Folklore: A Guide to Myths, Legends, Tales, Beliefs, and Customs. Oxford: Oxford University Press. ISBN 978-1576071212.
- Wise, Jennifer and Craig S. Walker, eds. 2003. The Broadview Anthology of Drama: Plays from the Western Theatre, Volume 1. Toronto: Braodview Press.
