= The Second Shepherds' Play =

Medieval mystery play

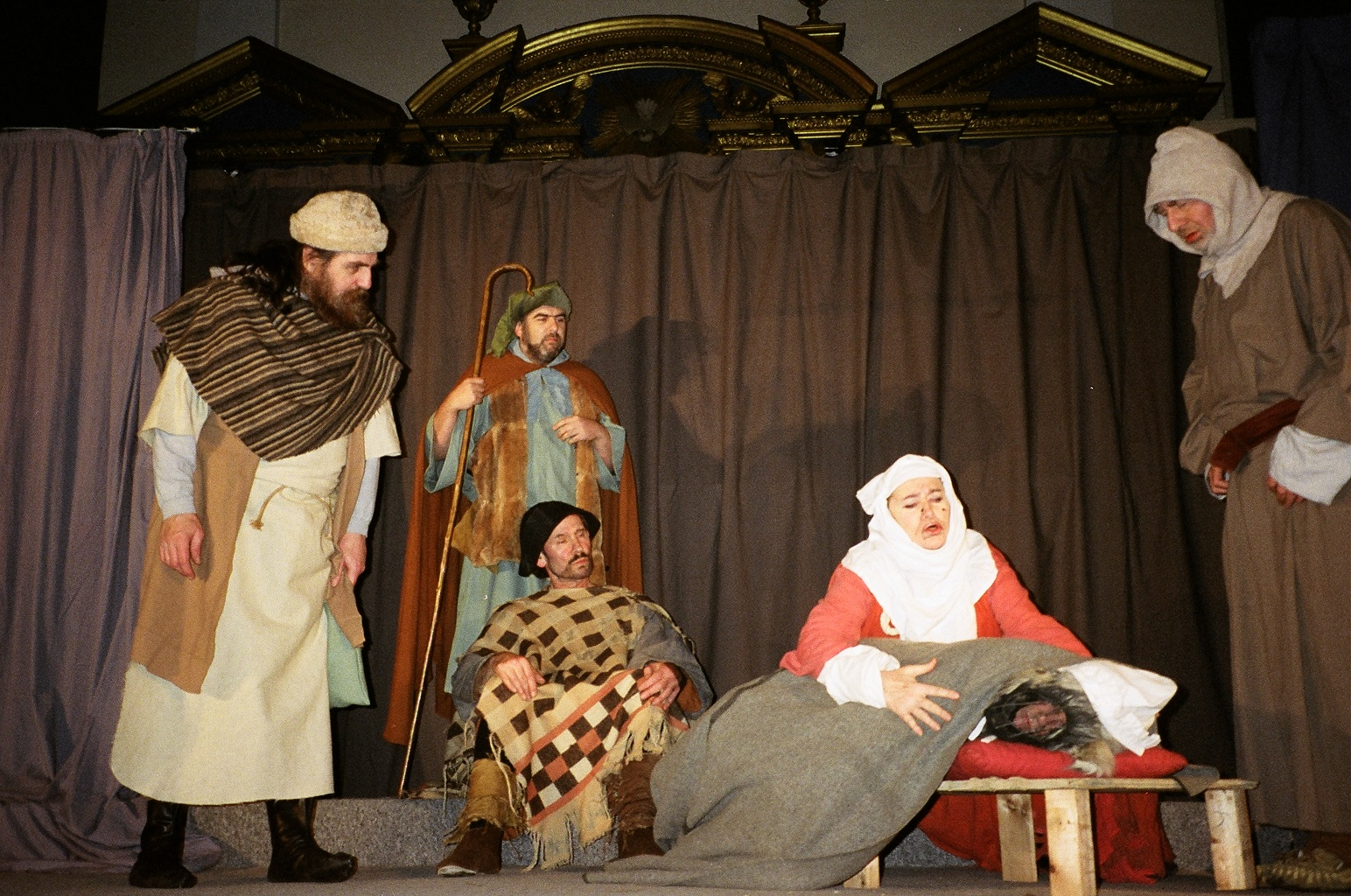
- The shepherds realise that the babe in the cradle is actually a sheep. Players of St Peter, London (2005).
- Original language: Middle English
- Written by: The Wakefield Master
- Characters: Coll, First Shepherd; Gib, Second Shepherd; Daw, Third Shepherd; Mak; Gill, Mak's wife; The Angel; Mary, mother of Jesus; Christ-child
- Series: Wakefield Cycle
- Genre: Mystery Play
- Setting: Medieval England and Bethlehem; 1st Century AD

Premiere
- Date: Unknown (possibly c. 1500)
- Place: England

The Second Shepherds' Play (also known as The Second Shepherds' Pageant) is a famous medieval mystery play which is contained in the manuscript HM1, the unique manuscript of the Wakefield Cycle. These plays are also referred to as the Towneley Plays, on account of the manuscript residing at Towneley Hall. The plays within the manuscript roughly follow the chronology of the Bible and so were believed to be a cycle, which is now considered not to be the case. This play gained its name because in the manuscript it immediately follows another nativity play involving the shepherds. In fact, it has been hypothesized that the second play is a revision of the first. It appears that the two shepherd plays were not intended to be performed together since many of the themes and ideas of the first play carry over to the second one. In both plays it becomes clear that Christ is coming to Earth to redeem the world from its sins. Although the underlying tone of The Second Shepherd's Play is serious, many of the antics that occur among the shepherds are extremely farcical in nature.

== Plot ==
The biblical portion of the play, a retelling of the Visitation of the Shepherds, comes only after a longer, invented story that mirrors it, in which the shepherds, before visiting the holy baby outside in a manger, must first rescue one of their sheep that has been hidden in a cradle indoors by a comically evil sheep-stealing couple. Once they have discovered and punished the thieves, the storyline switches to the familiar one of the three shepherds being told of the birth of Christ by an angel, and going to Bethlehem to offer the true Child gifts.

At the start of the play, Coll, the first shepherd ("primus pastor") arrives in a field, invoking God in anachronistic terms (referring, as the shepherds will do throughout the play, to the life and death of Christ even though at this point of the play Christ has not yet been born) complaining about the (typically English) cold weather and about his poverty and the arrogance of local gentry. He begins by saying, "Lord, what these weathers are cold! And I am ill happed" which translates as "Lord [God], the weather is cold and I am ill prepared/clothed." Gib, the second shepherd, arrives without seeing Coll and complains first about the weather and then about the plight of married men, himself included, with bawdy speculation about the lives of men with more than one wife and advice to "young men of wooing" to "Be well ware of wedding" (wary of marriage). He paints a portrait of his wife as a loud, heavy-drinking, alternately abusive and sentimentally pious, whale-sized woman. "By him that died for us all, I would I had run til I had lost her!" at which point he is startled by Coll. They confer about where Daw, a third, young, lazy and mischievous, shepherd, has gotten to, at which point Daw arrives complaining about employers, hunger, and about recent floods which he compares to Noah's flood.

Mak, a local good-for-nothing and well-known thief, arrives and pretends to be a yeoman from a lord. Although they recognize him from the start, he insults and threatens them by saying that he will have them flogged. When they threaten him, he pretends not to have known who they were. Mak tries to gain sympathy from the shepherds by explaining how his wife is a lazy drunk who gives birth to too many children. Invoking Christ and Pontius Pilate, Mak agrees to camp with the shepherds, and feigns to lie down among them. However, once they have fallen asleep he casts a spell to make sure they will not wake up and then sneaks off to steal one of their sheep. He heads back to his cottage and trades insults with Gill, his wife, who firmly believes that Mak will be hanged for the theft and comes up with a plan for hiding the sheep – she will put it in an empty cradle and pretend that it is her newborn child, and that she is loudly, painfully in labor with its twin, so that the shepherds will quickly give up any search.

Mak sneaks back among the shepherds and pretends to awaken along with them. They head off to take account of their sheep while Mak heads home to prepare. With despair at their catastrophic ill fortune, the shepherds realize a sheep is missing and go to search Mak's house. They are initially fooled by Mak and Gill's ruse despite Gill going so far as to say that if she's lying she'll eat the child in her cradle (as she indeed plans to). The shepherds leave defeated, but realize that they have failed to bring any gifts to the "baby", and go back. When they remove the swaddling clothes they recognize their sheep, but decide not to kill Mak but instead roll him in canvas and throw him up and down, punishing him until they are exhausted.

When they have left Mak's cottage, the biblical story proper begins – the Angel appears and tells them to go to "Bedlam" (Bethlehem) to see the Christ child. They wonder at the event, chastising each other for their collective delay, and then go to the manger where Mary (Mother of Jesus) welcomes them and receives their praise for her mildness. They each address the Child in turn, beginning by praising His authority and His creation of all things in tones of reverence and awe, but each comically shifting mid-speech to cooing, gushing baby talk, since they are addressing an adorable baby, whom Coll, Gib, and Daw respectively give "a bob of cherries," a bird, and a ball ("Have and play thee withal, and go to the tennis!") The shepherds rejoice at their salvation, all thoughts of hardship and complaint vanished, and leave singing in unison.

== Authorship ==
The name "Wakefield Master" is a title given by Charles Mills Gayley to an unknown author of at least five of the plays that are found in the Wakefield Mystery Plays. In 1903, Gayley and Alwin Thaler published an anthology of criticism and dramatic selections entitled Representative English Comedies. It had long been believed that the Towneley Play was a mediocre work that showed extensive borrowing from other sources but containing vibrant and exciting material, apparently by one author, who was responsible for four or five complete pageants and extensive revisions. Gayley refers to this person as the "master" (with a lowercase m) in the book. Then, in a 1907 article, Gayley amended this to "The Wakefield Master", the name which is still frequently used (Wakefield Cycle Authorship). Of the 32 plays found in the manuscript, tradition has attributed The Second Shepherd's Play to the "Wakefield Master", along with Noah, The First Shepherd's Play, Herod the Great, and The Buffeting of Christ. A sixth play, The Killing of Abel is also thought to have been heavily influenced by him if not exclusively written by him, along with The Last Judgment, to which he contributed at least half. Many of the other plays in the manuscript have a few stanzas that were most likely written by him as well.

Although nothing is known about the author, or the origins of the plays, it is agreed by several scholars that they date sometime between 1400-1450. Because of his influence in most of the Wakefield plays, it is possible he was brought into Wakefield with the purpose of editing and reworking the several plays that were already written, and did such a successful job that he was kept on to write several other plays afterwards. The plays he wrote might have replaced plays that were taken from York and it is believed that he is a contemporary to the "York Master", another unnamed playwright who produced several other influential plays during the same era.

Some question the existence of one "Wakefield Master", and propose that multiple authors could have written in the Wakefield Stanza. However, scholars and literary critics find it useful to hypothesize a single talent behind them, due to the unique poetic qualities of the works ascribed to him.

The plays of the "Wakefield Master" are identified by their unique stanza form, which is nine lines rhyming a a a a b c c c b with internal rhymes in the first four lines.

We that walk in the nights, our cattle to keep,

We see sudden sights, when other men sleep.

Yet methink my heart lights—I see shrews peep.

Ye are two all-wights! I will give my sheep

A turn.

But full ill have I meant;

As I walk on this bent,

I may lightly repent

My toes if I spurn.

This stanza format is the primary evidence critics use to identify what has been written by him. Along with his unique stanzas, the "Wakefield Master's" plays are also characterized by their emphasis on characterization that delves into the rural contemporary life of the characters. Using modern day technology which included plows, mills, and forges, as well as colloquial speech amongst the dialogue between the characters, the stories exemplified early traits of realism that would have made the stories more relevant for the audience of that time period.

The author also used contrasting dialects in The Second Shepherd's Play, in the part where Mak pretends to be a yeoman. The regular dialect is Northern-midlands, with Mak's deceptive dialect being from the south. Two different studies (Trusler, and Cawley) on the main dialect certified that these plays did come from Wakefield.

== Stage ==
Depending on the area of the performances, the plays were performed in the middle of the street, on pageant wagons in the streets of great cities (this was inconvenient for the actors because the small stage size made stage movement difficult), in the halls of nobility, or in the round in amphitheatres, as suggested by current archaeology in Cornwall and the southwest of England. All medieval stage production was temporary and expected to be removed upon the completion of the performances. Actors, predominantly male, typically wore long, dark robes. Medieval plays, such as the Wakefield cycle or the Digby Magdalene, featured lively interplay between two distinct areas—the wider spaces in front of the raised staging areas, and the elevated areas themselves (called, respectively, the platea and the locus). Also typical was to have the actors would move between these locations in order to suggest scene changes, rather than remain stationary and have the scene change around them as is typically done in modern theater.

The staging of this play likely required two sets. It is suggested that the first stage is composed of Mak's house. In Mak's house, many of the farcical actions occur (for example, this is the location of where the sheep was "born"). The other stage is where the holy manger and the religious iconography would occur. This is more than likely where the angel appears and where the Shepherds go to visit Mary. These two different stages would allow the audience to easily see the parallels between farcical and serious.

== Criticism and interpretation ==
Although Albert C. Baugh complained of the combination of low farce and high religious intent in the play, the unity is a distinctive feature of the play, where the Mak-subplot has been shown to have numerous analogues in world folklore. Wallace H. Johnson theorized that the union of a complete and independent farce with a complete and independent Nativity play resulted from the accumulation of years of horseplay and ad-libbing in rehearsal. Some have seen the folk-origins of the story as contributing to an extended reflection on class-struggle and solidarity in light of immediate and eternal realities, while others have emphasized the theological dimension, in which 15th century England is mystically conflated with first-century Judaea and the Nativity with the Apocalypse.

Maynard Mack explains that this play is often categorized as simple and containing little artistic merit. What begins to emerge in Mack's article is that he feels that the play is not only sophisticated, but the comedic aspects are there to enhance the rest of the text. He explains that in examining the text as two separate entities, a viewer would be doing the text a great injustice; rather, one should view them as a collection whole in order to understand the importance of exaggeration and the idea of a terrible beauty.

== Editions, translations, and performances ==
=== Editions ===
- 'The Second Shepherds' Play', in The Norton Anthology of English Literature: Volume A, the Middle Ages, ed. by James Simpson and Alfred David, 9th edn (New York: Norton, 2012), pp. 450-77
- The Towneley Plays, ed. by Garrett P.J. Epp (MIP 2018)
- 'The Wakefield Second Shepherds' Pageant', in Everyman and Medieval Miracle Plays, ed. by A. C. Cawley, Everyman's Library, 381, 2nd edn (London: Dent, 1922), pp. 79-108.

=== Translations ===
- Medieval English Verse and Prose in Modernized Version, ed. by Roger Sherman Loomis and Rudolph Willard(New York: Appleton-Century-Crofts, 1948).
- The Mysteries, trans. by Tony Harrison (London: Faber and Faber, 1985), pp. 59-72, 77-78.

=== Performances ===
- 'The Second Shepherds' Play', performed in 2020 by Lone Star College-Tomball
- The 1985 Cottesloe Theatre performance of the pageant, adapted into Modern English as The Mysteries, in three files on YouTube: 12:46 to end; whole track, and 00:00 to 1:46 and 8:00 to 11:17.

== See also ==
- Easter drama
- God Spede the Plough
- Liturgical drama
- Medieval theatre
- Passion play
- Wakefield Mystery Plays
