= Mansion stage =

A mansion stage is a small wooden platform with supports and a roof, commonly used in medieval theatre to represent specific locations (such as Heaven or Hell). Originating in churches, the actors would often move between these mansions as the play demanded. The acting area of the stage was called the platea, and mansions were placed around the platea. As the actors moved between the mansions, the platea would take on the scenic identity of each mansion. In England, pageant wagons were used for cycle dramas to hold the mansion, the platea, and a dressing area. These wagons moved the scene from one audience to the next, unlike in the church where mansions were stationary and both performers and the congregation moved from mansion to mansion.

== Sociohistorical context ==
After the fall of the Roman Empire, structured drama became practically nonexistent. Theatrical performances persisted to a small degree through local and traveling troupes of what were later called minstrels. These minstrels, along with monastery scholars, carried the knowledge and tradition of Roman theatre until the revival of theatre in the Early Middle Ages, beginning around 500 C.E. As the church’s power grew, they attempted to absorb the pagan religions. In order to draw people in, while allowing them to keep a sense of their traditions, they superimposed Christian theology on pagan holiday celebrations. Easter was already the appropriate time of year to take the place of the spring fertility festivals. The Roman festivals celebrating the births of Dionysus, Osiris, and other lesser deities became Christmas, although Christ's birth had never been celebrated in the winter before.

To keep up with the elaborate and theatrical celebrations found in the pagan religions, the church began creating spectacle performances. For example, they might place a cross wrapped in burial clothes in a tomb on Good Friday and raise it on Sunday, or stage elaborate mystery plays such as the one that lasted multiple days in the town of Mons, France. The processionals evolved into the liturgical dramas of the high Middle Ages. By 1300, the performance of liturgical dramas in churches was widespread across Western Europe, and so began the use of mansions and plateas, which persisted throughout the Middle Ages.

In the 14th century, the Church in England, in an attempt to continue to spark interest and devotion to the church, began to build movable mansions, called pageant wagons, to carry to different parts of town to create an elaborate travelling show. Carrying the performances out of the church, the play slowly became more secular. Audiences prized the comic characters such as lesser demons and drunks, and those who played them well, reigniting professionalism in performance. The use of mansions, and eventually pageant wagons helped to create an affirmation of faith in the church in the Middle Ages.

== Specific characteristics of mansions ==
In the earliest days of liturgical drama, plays were performed inside the church with limited scenery and the focus of the audience on the action. Mansions were used to indicate location but much of the performance took place on the platea, the open space in front of the scenic structure, with the actors moving from mansion to mansion only when strictly necessary. The increase in length of the plays and the inclusion of a wider variety of locations that needed to be represented by individual mansions were part of what caused the movement of performances from clergy control inside church spaces (where mansions were nestled within structural arches or alcoves) to laity control outdoors in the streets or public squares.

This movement to the outdoors resulted in two different methods of staging: in England, mansions were converted into pageant wagons, which could be wheeled along in a parade-like fashion from audience to audience, while in France and the rest of continental Europe, the stations were more commonly lined up in an open square, sometimes on a u-shaped or circular platform, and the actors would move from mansion to mansion. As time passed, the plays came to be performed in the vernacular and required the involvement of community members, local guilds, and patronage from town government to produce increasingly spectacular cycle, mystery, and morality plays.

Mansions, either stationary or moveable, represented a wide variety of locations such as the House of Adam, the Temple, the Garden of Gethsemane, and Mount Olivet, and were often lavishly decorated to add to the spectacle of the performance. In the mystery play at Mons, France in 1501, five painters were hired to paint the 67 mansion stages with various pigments as well as varnish, gold leaf, and silver powder. They were also responsible for painting the backdrops, the furniture and other set pieces, and imitation draperies. It is likely that because of the limited amount of total stage space, many of the mansion stages doubled for one another or were changed in between scenes. Flying machines, trapdoors, rope-and-pulley systems, and special effects such as a dragon that spit fire, light shining from the manger in the Nativity and torrential rain for the creation of the world were popular. Machinery or hidden sections such as Heaven would often be concealed with drapery or painted clouds, as was done in the Mons production.

A great number of people were employed in the production of these mansions, from Jehan de Dours, cabinetmaker, paid 48 sols for “making castles and turrets”, to Pierart Viscave, tinker, for installing sheets of metal to be used to create thunder effects, to Jehan du Fayt and seventeen assistants for working as stage hands for the nine-day performance. Both the production period and the performance of the outdoor vernacular medieval drama were extensive, with the 22 mansions for a production in Rouen prepared over 18 years. These medieval spectacles laid the foundation for the flourishing of drama in the Renaissance of later centuries.

== See also ==
- Liturgical drama
- Medieval architecture
- Medieval guilds
- Scenic design
