= Periaktos =

Staging device for scene changes in Ancient Greek and Roman theatre

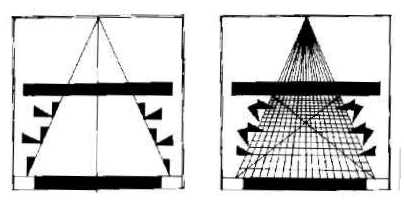
Use of periaktos in 17th century theater. In: Architectura recreationis, by J. Furttenbach

A periaktos (plural form periaktoi, from a Greek word meaning revolving) is a device used for displaying and rapidly changing theatre scenes. It was first mentioned in Vitruvius's De architectura, but its most intense use began in Renaissance theatre, as a result of the work of important theatrical designers, such as Nicola Sabbatini. It consists of a revolving solid equilateral triangular prism made of wood. On each of its three faces, a different scene is painted, so that, by quickly revolving the periaktos, another face can appear to the audience. Other solid polygons can be used, such as cubes, but triangular prisms offer the best combination of simplicity, speed and number of scenes per device.

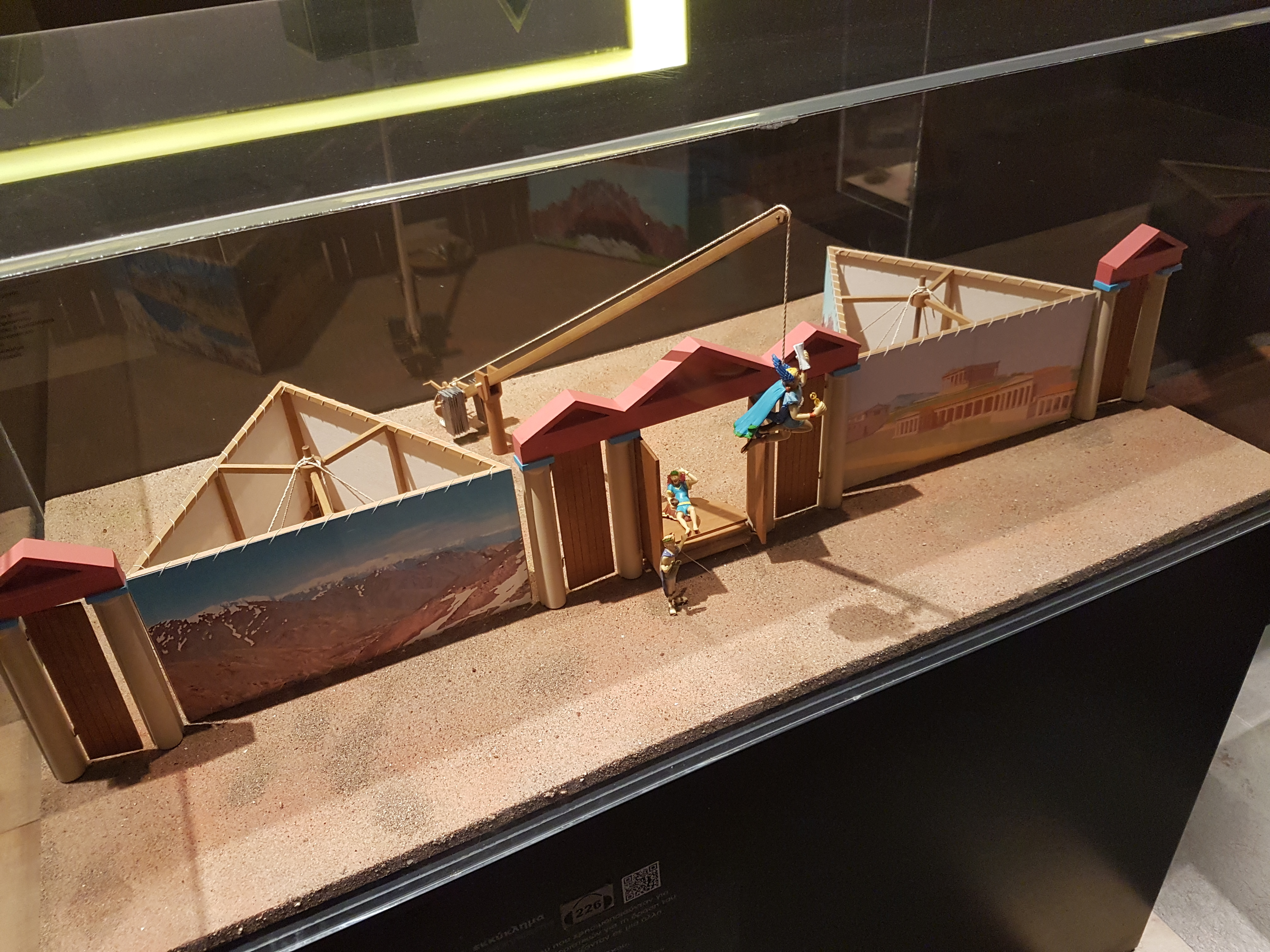
A tabletop model of a set with two periaktoi

A series of periaktoi positioned one after the other along the stage's depth can produce the illusion of a longer scene, composed by its faces as seen in perspective. These periaktoi must therefore be rotated simultaneously to a new position, thus achieving interesting illusions. This is made by coupling them by using sprocket gears at their bases and a flat chain or conveyor belt mechanical transmission system. A similar concept is used in some modern Trivision multi-message billboards, which are made up of a series of triangular prisms arranged so that they can be rotated to present three separate flat display surfaces in succession.

Early motion picture mechanical devices, such as the praxinoscope, were also based on rapidly rotating solid polygons, which had the successive animation or photographic plates affixed or projected to each face, thus providing the optical illusion of movement.

== See also ==
- Scenic painting
- Scenography
- Set construction
- skênê
- Stagecraft
- Scenic design
