= The Play of the Weather =

English play

The Play of the Weather is an English interlude or morality play from the early Tudor period. The play was written by John Heywood, a courtier, musician and playwright during the reigns of Henry VIII, Edward VI, and Mary I, and published by his brother-in-law, William Rastell, in 1533 as The Play of the Wether, a new and mery interlude of all maner of Wethers. It represents the Roman deity Jupiter on earth asking mortals to make cases for their preferred weather following heavenly dissension among the gods. It is the first published play to nominate "The Vice" on its title page.

== Date ==
There has been much critical debate concerning the dating of the play since David Bevington's assertion in 1968 that it was written in the 1520s. Greg Walker suggested that it was written and performed between 1529 and 1530 but later modified this to 1533 on the basis of the argument made by Axton and Happe in the introduction to their edition of Heywood's plays. The play is often dated on internal evidence, particularly the so-called ‘new moon’ speech which seems to allude to the changing of King Henry VIII's consort from Catherine of Aragon to Anne Boleyn and his quest for a male heir.

More recent research into the play conducted as part of the Oxford Brookes University/Historic Royal Palaces project, "Staging the Henrician Court", has suggested a date of Christmas 1532/3. As there were no Christmas revels in 1531 because of Catherine's absence from court, and the coronation of Anne Boleyn took place in June 1533, a court performance can be speculatively dated to Christmas 1532, prior to the secret marriage of Henry and Anne.

== Synopsis ==
Having resolved the warring factions of Aeolus, Phoebus, Saturn and Phoebe in his heavenly parliament, Jupiter descends to earth to solicit the views of Englishmen and women as to the ideal state of the weather and so create harmony between earth and heaven. To aid him in his task he appoints Merry Report, who publishes the purpose of Jupiter's descent across the country, and mediates who does and who does not gain direct access to Jupiter to make their case. The play then depicts a series of English citizens petitioning for their preferred weather.

The first to enter is the Gentleman, who desires fair and temperate weather for his hunting. The Merchant petitions for fair weather with gusts to help move his ships through the seas. The Ranger asks for windier weather so that he can augment his income by selling fallen branches. When the Water-miller comes on-stage to argue for rain to power his mill, he is joined by the Wind-miller who counter-argues for wind and no rain to power his own. A lengthy debate ensues between the two Millers as to which of their mills is more useful than the other and therefore who should have their desired weather. Female characters then enter the stage in the form of the Gentlewoman who essentially petitions for no weather so that when she leaves the house she is not exposed to the elements and her beauty is able to remain intact, and the Laundress who requires the heat of the sun to dry her clothes. As with the Millers, their debate concerns who is the more deserving – is it a beautiful woman or an industrious one? Their dialogue is interspersed throughout with the bawdy of Merry Report. Finally, a young boy enters the stage asking for wintry weather that he may trap birds and have snowball fights with his friends.

As Jupiter has only granted direct access to his person to the Gentleman and the Merchant, Merry Report then summarises the other characters’ arguments for the god so that he can deliver his judgement. Having heard the contrary and differing needs of his earthly subjects, Jupiter reasons that no one member of society is more important than another, and that they all need at least some part of the weather they desire to pursue their pastimes and occupations. He therefore declares that the weather will remain exactly as it was before so that everyone is happy for at least some of the time.

== Sources ==
The Play of the Weather is an early instance of the interlude or moral interlude, a theatrical development from the morality play and a precursor to the late Tudor drama in its portrayal of people from the lower classes rather than noble, biblical or classical characters. It tends to be grouped with a series of plays from Mankind onwards such as Gentleness and Nobility, Magnificence, Youth and Hick Scorner. It was published in quick succession with a number of Heywood's other interludes such as Johan Johan, The Pardoner and the Frere and The Play of Love.

In 1907, Joseph Quincy Adams, Jr., suggested that Heywood might have been influenced by Lucian’s Icaro-Menippus when representing Jupiter on earth, notably the passage: “...close to every one was placed a golden chair. Jupiter sat down in the first he came to, and lifting up the lid, listened to the prayers, which, as you may suppose, were of various kinds...One sailor asked for a north-wind, another for a south; the husbandmen prayed for rain, and the fuller for sun-shine...One petition, indeed, puzzled him a little; two men asking favors of him, directly contrary to each other, at the same time, and promising the same sacrifice; he was at a loss which to oblige.”

== Significance ==
The date of the play suggests a connection with the King’s Great Matter, and Jupiter has been seen as analogous to Henry VIII. As the Great Matter was linked to the English Reformation which would ultimately create Henry as the Supreme Head of the Church of England and make him responsible for the temporal and spiritual welfare of his subjects, the play has been interpreted as a rehearsal of some of the new responsibilities Henry would undertake. While it is represented as prudent for a ruler to listen to the counsel and needs of his subjects, the play also depicts Jupiter as having the final word, and therefore looks forward to an absolutist monarchy. Greg Walker has argued that, in the face of the religious changes about to affect the country, the Catholic John Heywood is making a case for religious tolerance and moderation in the future.

Noting similarities between Heywood’s Jupiter and the tyrants of the medieval mystery plays, Candace Lines sees in the god of The Play of the Weather a far more satirical representation of kingship than other critics of the play. In an argument which might proscribe courtly performance, she writes, “Even the play’s seemingly innocent meteorological plot contains associations with the cycle drama tyrants. In the York cycle and the fragmentary Coventry cycle, Herod claims to control the weather...Jupiter’s resemblance to the York Herod is even stronger, because this Herod mingles his claim of weather-controlling prowess with an assertion of his authority over classical gods.”
