= Johan Johan The Husband =

Tudor era farcical comedic interlude by John Heywood

The Merry Play between John John the Husband, Tib his Wife, and Sir John, the Priest is a Tudor era farcical comedic interlude written in 1520 and first published in 1533 by English playwright John Heywood. It relates the tale of a common Englishman who believes his wife to be cheating on him with the local priest. The play can be said to contain elements of a medieval morality play, but as the characters are not simple abstract personifications of a vice or virtue, John John can be seen to forge a link between the simpler morality plays of the medieval period, and the complex drama of the early modern period.

== Synopsis ==
=== Dramatis personæ ===
- JOHN JOHN, The husband of Tib, and a cuckold
- TIB, His domineering and disloyal wife
- SIR JOHN, a roughish priest

=== Plot ===
John John opens with the eponymous character alone in his poorly kept home, wondering after the whereabouts of his wife, Tyb, and debating whether he should beat her when she arrives. However, when she does come home, she is instantly domineering, and he is instantly submissive. John believes his wife has been with the local priest, Sir John, and claims that he is a well known knave. Tyb, however, claims to have been making a pie with Sir John and several other women’s help. She then produces the pie as evidence.

Tyb orders John to go invite the priest to sup with them, but not before she makes him carry out all the domestic chores in preparation for Sir John's arrival. John goes to Sir John’s house, where he and the priest converse, and John is relieved to hear that the priest has chastised Tyb for her treatment of John, and believes that Tyb is furious with him for his words. The priest initially refuses to come, but John convinces him, believing that the priest a friend.

Once at home, Tyb sends John out to fetch water in a pail, and it is revealed during his absence that the priest has been lying to him, and that Tyb and Sir John intend to make a fool of him. John returns with no water, as the bucket has a “cleft” in it. Tyb tells him to repair it, and Sir John produces two wax candles for the work. The priest and Tyb then go to eat pie at the table together, while John is left to polish and rub the hard wax candles alone by the fire so they will be soft enough to repair the cleft.

Tyb and Sir John finish the entire pie, then mock John when he complains, pretending that they gave him some. John has had enough by this point, so he fights with both of his tormentors, throwing them out. John does not have long to enjoy his victory, however, as his anxiety over what the two will do now that they are alone together quickly sends him out the door after them.

== Themes/Motifs ==
John John has a clear central message against allowing wives, and indeed women in general, too much leniency. The main character, John John, is, until the ending, completely ineffectual in his attempts to control his wife, and it is from this reversal of the laws of the early modern English household that the play derives its conflict. To theatre goers of the time, this would have been a significant role reversal, and the constant emasculation of John would have been extremely humorous.

First and foremost, this play was meant to entertain its audience, with vulgar humour and reversed expectations. It has little to criticize about the society it portrays. However, as a relatively early Renaissance work, its influence on later pieces of the period can be seen in many significant plays, especially the character of the domineering wife. This theme is present in notable Renaissance plays such as Epicœne, or The silent woman, by Ben Jonson, and The Taming of the Shrew by William Shakespeare. Clearly this reversal of roles was a popular source of comedy and conflict in early modern England.

== Genre ==
As a Tudor period play, John John represents a transition between medieval morality play, and Renaissance theatre. While the characters are flat, they are presented as fully realized humans, rather than in a typical morality play, such as Everyman, in which the characters are named for what they represent, such as Fellowship, Kindred, and Good Deeds. John John still contains a traditional moral message however, concerning the dangers of female sexuality, and lacks the moral complexity of a true Renaissance play like The Tragedy of Mariam, by Elizabeth Tanfield Cary, in which the correct course of action for the characters is not always clear.

== Publication ==
John John was first published in 1533 in Folio format. There are no other notable publications. It is notable that the play contains a negative portrayal of a Catholic priest during a time of religious upheaval, The Reformation, which may have contributed to its popularity. The English schism with the Catholic Church in the early 1530s may have contributed to it being chosen for publication.

== Influences ==
- John John shares significant plot similarities with an earlier French farce called Farce du Paste. Both contain a husband who suspects his wife to be cheating on him, but lacks the strength of will to confront his tormentors.
