= The Four PP =

16th c. interlude by John Heywood

Cover page of The Four PP by John Heywood showing the three chief characters Pedlar, Pothecary and Pardoner amid the lying competition.

The Play called the foure PP; a newe and a very mery interlude of a palmer, a pardoner, a potycary, a pedler or The Four PP (pronounced "pees", plural of the name of the letter P) is an interlude by John Heywood written around 1530 that relates the tale of four men whose trades begin with the letter P. The characters in the play include two churchmen (a Pardoner and a Palmer), a medieval pharmacist (an aPothecary), and a Pedlar. The play has no female characters.

== Plot ==
The four characters introduce themselves and quarrel. To settle the argument, the Pedlar challenges them to hold a competition of lying. With Pedlar as the judge, the man with the unsurmountable lie would have mastery over the others. Pardoner starts by boasting about his relics since he is licensed to sell papal indulgences. The Pothecary begins by telling in crude details his marvelous cure. The tale has many bawdy elements. The Pardoner relates the tale of his visit to hell and how he witnessed the frustration of Lucifer and his company with one of his neighbours Margery Corson and would gladly get rid of her. They request the Pardoner to make sure (through the use of his pardons) that no more women are sent to hell. At last, the Palmer, accepting the tale of the Pardoner as plausible, tops the lies off by stating that he has never seen "any one woman out of patience". This way, he is the winner of the competition.

== Criticism ==
Greg Walker has argued that the lack of plot (for example, in Four PP where as soon as the Palmer has mastery over the Pardoner and Pothecary, he gives it up) has a lot to do with Heywood's political views. As these plays can logically be assumed to have been performed in the presence of the king on at least one occasion, it is a very fruitful reading of the plays to consider the ways in which Heywood is in fact arguing for a peaceful resolution to the conflicts caused by events leading up to the schism of 1531.
