= Skene (theatre) =

Structure behind a theatre stage

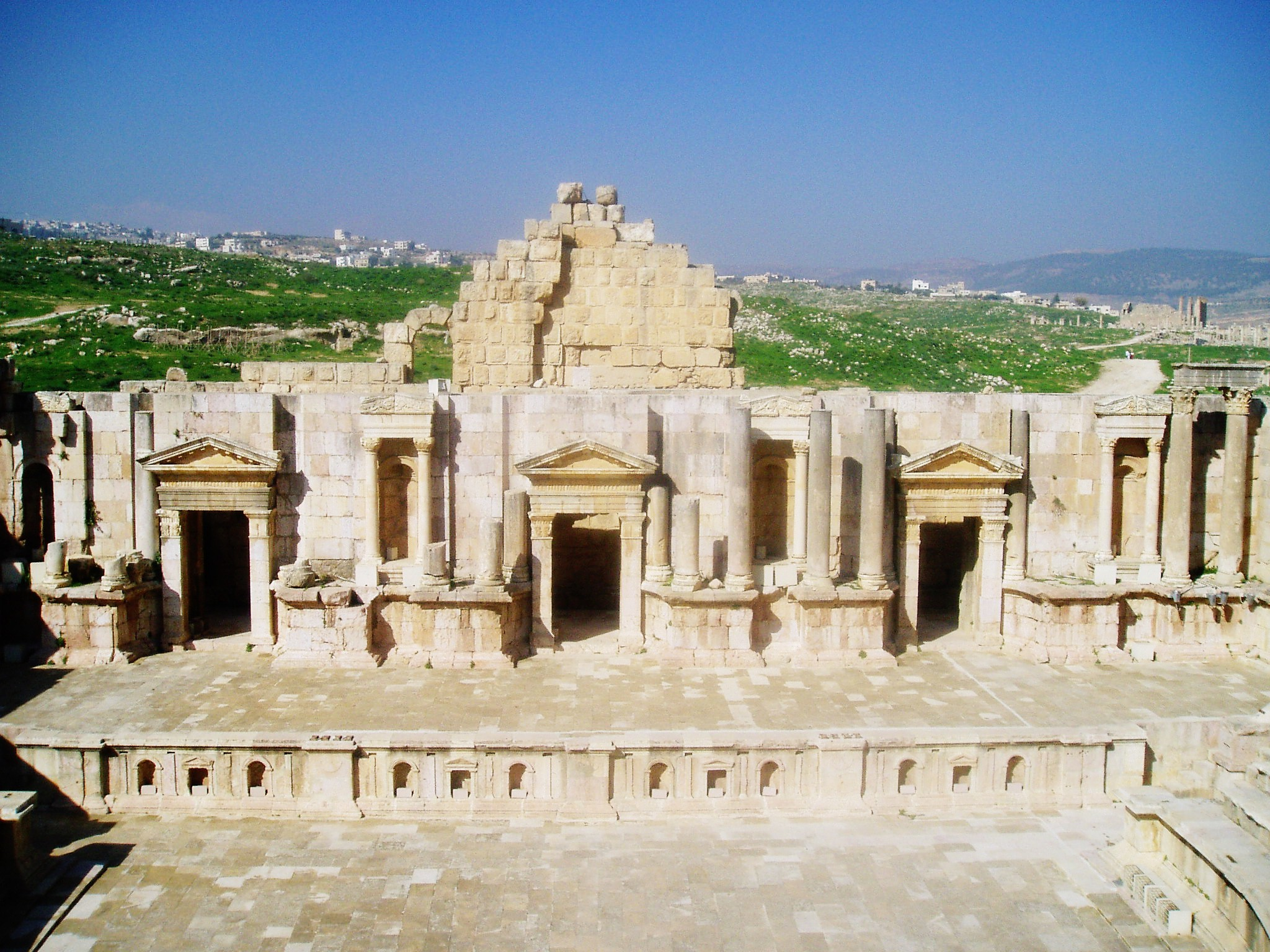
The stage of the South Roman theatre in Jerash, Jordan; the structure at the back is the scaenae frons.

In the theatre of ancient Greece, the skene was the structure at the back of a stage. The word skene means 'tent' or 'hut', and it is thought that the original structure for these purposes was a tent or light building of wood and was a temporary structure. It was initially a very light structure or just cloth hanging from a rope, but over the course of time the skene underwent fundamental changes. First, it became a permanent building, whose roof could sometimes be used to make speeches, and as time passed it was raised up from the level of the orchestra, creating a proskenion, or "space in front of the skene". The facade of the proskenion was behind the orchestra and provided a space for supporting stage scenery.

During the Roman Period, the skene had become a large and complex, elaborately decorated, stone building on several levels. Actors emerged from the parodoi and could use its steps and balconies to speak from. It was also where costumes were stored and to which the periaktoi (painted panels serving as the background) were connected.

== Classical Greece ==
Ancient Greek theatre began in the 6th century BC and traces its origins to religious rituals such as the Festival of Dionysus and choral odes to the gods known as dithyrambs. Early Greek theatres were simple open air structures built on the slope of a hill. The Theatre of Dionysus in Athens is thought to have been the first purpose-built theatre. Around the middle of the 5th century BC, the skene began to appear in Greek theatre. Placing a skene behind the orchestra – where the performers acted, played, and danced – broke what is thought to have been the original theatre in the round nature of Greek theatre. The skene also served as another "hidden stage". At times some of the action went on inside, in which case it was up to the audience to decide what was happening based on the noises coming from the inside. It was a convention of the dramas of the classic period that characters never died on stage, instead usually retreating into the skene to do so.

At some point at Athens in the Classical period a small stoa colonnade was constructed behind the scene-building with its back to the theatre and would have provided a permanent backdrop for the action."

== Hellenistic period ==
The Hellenistic period started around the time of Alexander the Great's death in 323 BC and lasted until the Roman Victory at the Battle of Actium in 31 BC. As Ancient Greece began to change from a culture consisting of ethnic and city-state Greeks to one governed by large monarchies, theatre architecture to include the stage buildings began to experience significant changes. In the 4th century BC, the skene became a permanent stone structure and the stage was raised off the ground. In surviving examples this stage seems to have been raised by 2.5–4 m above the orchestra, and to have been 2–4 m deep, terminated by the skene.

As the Greek chorus declined in importance compared to a smaller group of main actors, the chorus remained in the orchestra to perform, while the main actors generally performed from the stage on top of the proskenion. This important change occurred in the Hellenistic period, between the 3rd and 1st centuries BC. The skene itself became increasingly elaborate, and was also available as a place for actors to declaim from, so that the performers between them had three levels available. "The roof of the skene was called the theologeion ('god-speaking'), from which one might assume that its primary use was for the advent of deities, either at the start or close of the drama." Most theatres still standing today date from the Hellenistic period.

== Roman period ==
In Roman theatres, scaenae frons ('facade of the skene') is the term for the elaborately decorated stone screens, rising two or three stories, that the skene had now become. By the 1st century BC, the skene was as elaborate as its Roman development, which dispensed with the orchestra altogether, leaving a relatively low proscenium facade, often decorated, and a wide stage or pulpitum behind, ending in an elaborate scaenae frons with three or more doors, and sometimes three stories. The evolution of the actor, who assumed an individual part and answered to the chorus (the word for actor, hypokrites, means 'answerer'), introduced into drama a new form, the alternation of acted scenes, or episodes. The skene no longer supported painted sets in the Greek manner, but relied for effect on elaborate permanent architectural decoration and consisted of a series of complex stone buildings. To each side there was a paraskenion. The episkenion was the upper floor of the skene, which might be deepened to give a third stage level, seen through thyromata or openings. The interior of the logeion ('building') behind the skene facade remained normally outside the view of the audience, and fulfilled the original function as a changing room and place for props.

== Surviving examples ==
Period	Ancient city	Modern city	Country	Notes, references	Photographs
Roman	Emerita Augusta	Mérida	Spain		
Roman	Nova Trajana Bostra	Bosra	Syria		
Hellenistic	Athens	Athens	Greece		
Roman	Leptis Magna	Khoms	Libya		
Hellenistic	Epidaurus	Argolis	Greece		
