= John Heywood =

English writer (c. 1497 – c. 1580)

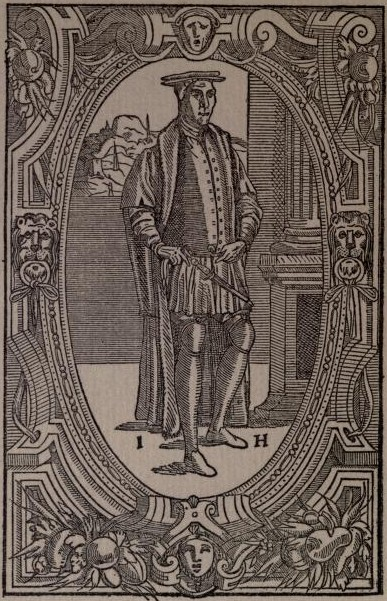
Heywood portrait 1556

John Heywood (c. 1497 – c. 1580) was an English writer known for his plays, poems, and collection of proverbs. Although he is best known as a playwright, he was also active as a musician and composer, though no musical works survive. A devout Catholic, he nevertheless served as a royal servant to both the Catholic and Protestant regimes of Henry VIII, Edward VI, Mary I, and Elizabeth I.

== Life ==
Heywood was born in 1497, probably in Coventry, and moved to London sometime in his late teens. He spent time studying at Broadgates Hall (now Pembroke College), Oxford, but did not obtain a degree. His language skills can be seen by his adaptation of his play Johan Johan from the French La Farce du pâté. His name first appears in the King Henry VIII's Household Books in 1519 as a 'synger', a job for which he received quarterly payments of 100 shillings. In 1521 he began receiving annual rents from lands in Essex, lands recently seized by the crown which made Heywood wealthy and propertied. In 1523, he received the freedom of the City of London with the help of Henry VIII. At Michaelmas 1525 he received £6. 13s. 4d. as a 'player of virginals'. At about the same time he married Jane Rastell, the niece of Sir Thomas More. Through this marriage, Heywood entered into a very theatrical family. Jane's father John Rastell was a composer of interludes and was the first publisher of plays in England. When Rastell built his own house in Finsbury Fields, he built a stage explicitly for the performance of plays, and his wife made costumes. It appears that the whole family, including Thomas More, were involved in these productions. In this private theatre, Heywood found an audience for his early works, and a strong artistic influence in his father-in-law. In the 1520s and 1530s, he was writing and producing interludes for the royal court. He enjoyed the patronage of Edward VI and Mary I, writing plays to present at court. While some of his plays call for music, no songs or texts survive.

Heywood was retained at four royal courts (Henry, Edward, Mary, Elizabeth), despite the unpopular political views which he and his family held. Heywood was a devout Catholic, and there are signs that he was a favourite of King Henry despite his political beliefs (Henry, despite his split with Rome was a staunch believer in the Catholic faith). In 1530, he transferred from the Stationers Guild to the Mercers Company, where he was made Common Measurer, although he did not appear to work with cloth in any way in his career. In 1533, he received a gilt cup from the king. Heywood was in a politically unstable environment during the creation of the Church of England, and he was not timid about letting his political views be known. Greg Walker notes that Heywood wrote a poem in defence of Princess Mary shortly after she was disinherited. In plays like The Four PP (pronounced "pees", plural of the name of the letter P), Heywood takes a page from Chaucer's book in representing a corrupt Pardoner, but at the end of the play the Pedler chastises the Pothecary for "raylynge her openly / At pardons and relyques so leudly" (lines 1199–1200).

Heywood's representations in his plays cater to popular tastes but contain an undercurrent of Catholic conservatism. The Palmer ends the play with the blessing "besechynge our lorde to prosper you all / In the fayth of hys churche universall" (line 1234). Walker reads this as an indication of Heywood's desire to persuade the King to avoid creating any sort of schism. Heywood is therefore more conciliatory than his famous uncle-in-law Thomas More, who was executed for his religious beliefs, (interpreted as high treason) in the face of Henry VIII's changes. Heywood was arrested for his part in the Prebendaries Plot in 1543 which sought to arraign Archbishop Cranmer for heresy. A contemporary writer, Sir John Harington, observed that Heywood "escaped hanging with his mirth" (7). Heywood was most successful in Mary's court, where he redrafted his allegory The Spider and the Fly in order to compliment the queen. Though Heywood had performed for Elizabeth's court, he was forced to flee England for Brabant because of the Act of Uniformity against Catholics in 1564. He died in Mechelen, in present-day Belgium.

His son was the poet and translator Jasper Heywood, his daughter was Elizabeth Heywood, and his grandson was the poet and preacher John Donne.

== Themes ==
Arthur F. Kinney writes that Heywood 'seems to have survived an unusually long and turbulent existence both by his use of "good learning" – his use of literary sources, especially More and Chaucer, and his intelligent if often oblique commentary on religious and social issues – and his wit, his sociability and his playfulness'. While Fraser and Rabkin argue that Heywood's plays represent primitive drama, the long monologues in his text would have required actors with an extraordinary range. Many scholars have conjectured that Heywood was probably a performer in his own plays, due to the frequent references in royal expense accounts to Heywood as a performer of various kinds. The plays might seem simple due to their lack of plot in the modern sense, but the ideas that Heywood explores are developed through the exposition of the characters in an equally complex way, even if it might seem foreign to modern sensibilities. Greg Walker has argued that the lack of plot (for example, in Four PP where as soon as the Palmer has mastery over the Pardoner and Pothecary, he gives it up) has a lot to do with Heywood's political views. As these plays can logically be assumed to have been performed in the presence of the king on at least one occasion, it is a very fruitful reading of the plays to consider the ways in which Heywood is in fact arguing for a peaceful resolution to the conflicts caused by events leading up to the schism of 1531.

Richard Axton and Peter Happé observe that Heywood's longer plays would probably take at least an hour and a half to perform, including the songs and acrobatic routines. Their sparse staging requirements (most of the plays require no more furniture than perhaps a table and a chair) would mean that they could be performed almost anywhere, whether it be in a dining hall or as Cameron Louis suggests, the Inns of Court. Most of his works would require four actors or fewer, and would have been performed by adult performers. Axton and Happe conclude as there is no doubling of roles, the plays would have not used professional actors. The major exception would be his play The Play of the Weather which required ten boy actors, and elaborate staging.

== Works ==
A partial list:

=== Plays ===
- Witty and Witless or, A Dialogue on Wit and Folly (on archive.org)
- Gentleness and Nobility with John Rastell
- The Mery Play betwene Johan Johan, the Husbande, Tyb, his Wyf, and Syr Johan, the Preest
- A Mery Play betwene the Pardoner and the Frere, the Curate and Neybour Pratte (written before 1521; published 1533)
- The Play called the foure PP; a newe and a very mery interlude of a palmer, a pardoner, a potycary, a pedler (c. 1530)
- The Play of the Wether, a new and mery interlude of all maner of Wethers (1533)
- The Play of Love (1533)

=== Verse ===
- The Spider and the Flie (1556)
- A Dialogue Conteinyng the Nomber in Effect of All the Prouerbes in the Englishe Tongue, Compacte in a Matter Concernyng Two Maner of Mariages (1546); (enlarged edition 1550)
- A Balade Specifyienge Partly the Maner, Partly the Matter, in the Mariage betwene Our Soueraigne Lord, and Our Soueraigne Lady (1554)
- A Breefe Balet Touchyng the Traytorous Takynge of Scarborow Castell (1557)
- A Ballad against Slander and Detraction (1562)

=== Collections ===
- Proverbs (c. 1538)
- The Proverbs of John Heywood (1546), originally titled A dialogue conteinyng the nomber ... of all the prouerbes in the englishe tongue.

== Famous epigrams ==
- What you have, hold.
- Haste maketh waste. (1546)
- Out of sight out of mind. (1542)
- When the sun shineth, make hay. (1546)
- Look ere ye leap. (1546)
- Two heads are better than one. (1546)
- Love me, love my dog. (1546)
- Beggars should be no choosers. (1546)
- All is well that ends well. (1546)
- The fat is in the fire. (1546)
- I know on which side my bread is buttered. (1546)
- One good turn asketh another. (1546)
- A penny for your thought. (1546)
- Rome was not built in one day. (1546)
- Better late than never. (1546)
- An ill wind that bloweth no man to good. (1546)
- The more the merrier. (1546)
- You cannot see the wood for the trees. (1546)
- This hitteth the nail on the head. (1546)
- No man ought to look a given horse in the mouth. (1546)
- Tread a woorme on the tayle and it must turne agayne. (1546)
- Wolde ye bothe eate your cake and haue your cake? (1562)
- When he should get aught, each finger is a thumb. (1546)
