= Pageant wagon =

A pageant wagon is a movable stage or wagon used to accommodate the mystery and miracle play cycles of the 10th through the 16th century. These religious plays were developed from biblical texts; at the height of their popularity, they were allowed to stay within the churches, and special stages were erected for them.

Pageant comes from the archaic word for the wagon stage, "pagyn.” It is a word used to describe the movable stage on which a scene of the processional religious play was performed.

The origin of the religious play began in medieval churches. The dramas began as a simple way to impart the message of the Bible to the people. They then grew and developed their own conventions. They brought to the common person a pageantry and entertainment so necessary to relieve the people from the monotony of the everyday task.

In places like St. Gall, Switzerland, in the 10th century, the Easter mass was often an occasion for festive performance. Pantomimes would take place in the church depicting Christ's resurrection. A few centuries later in Florence, Filippo Brunelleschi (1377–1446) began to create theatrical depictions of religious texts and see them as a potential work of art.

It was not until 1493 however, that the Sacra Rappresentazione, an earlier form of the Mystery Play, was presented on a scaffold in the church in which “hundreds of lights encircled the ‘Throne of God.”

This new form of spectacle based theatrical representation of both Old and New Testament texts spread throughout Europe and encompassed North and Central Europe, France, Germany, Netherlands, Belgium, and England. As the plays became more than mere pantomimes of biblical stories, they took on bigger texts and were performed at Christmas, Corpus Christi, and numerous other religious saints days or feasts.

As the drama of the production became more ambitious, the playing spaces also grew. The plays originally were performed on the altar of the church but grew to encompass the entirety of the front of the church. Eventually the plays grew beyond the capacity of the interior of the church and moved its front steps while also making use of the length and width of the streets. The performances sometimes even enveloped the public square just beyond the church steps. Since there was little space in these areas to provide a backdrop for scenery, the people created “mansions”, or wooden stages, on which to create the play. Eventually these stages would evolve into movable wagons as the troupes playing on them began to take their shows throughout the towns and play to different audiences.

== Description ==
Very little is known of the specifics of the construction of the pageant wagon. However, we do have a few speculations on the construction of English wagons, but they are from a much later time than when pageant wagons would have been used.

One such description comes from a late sixteenth- / early seventeenth-century manuscript entitled A Breviarye or Some Few Recollections of the City of Chester by David Rogers. It states that the pageant wagons were wooden structures with two rooms. They contained both a higher room where the play was performed and a lower room where the players changed clothing. The whole structure was mounted on six wheels. The entire structure would be 15 feet tall with the playing space being 9 feet above the street.

This follows along with a description from the memory of an Archdeacon Robert Rogers who, in 1595, is quoted as saying

"..pagiants weare a high scafolde with two rowmes, a higher and a lower, upon four wheeles. In the lower they apparelled them selves, and in the higher rowme they played, beinge all open on the tope, that all behoulders mighte heare and see them."

This description comes at a time when pageant wagons were seldom used anymore and is subject to reinterpretation by the author.

In opposition to these descriptions, Glynne Wickham argues in The Early English Stages, that the wagon was only a one level structure taken up entirely by off stage space used for a dressing room. This would provide the backdrop for the performance as well. The acting would then take place on a scaffold alongside the cart or on the street.

This description would testify towards how cumbersome it would have been for a multi-level cart to travel throughout the towns on such unwieldy streets. A cart closer to the ground would be significantly easier to manage yet might not have offered such a vantage point as a two-story structure.

A Norwich inventory from 1565 describes one such wagon as a house of wainscot painted and built on a cart with four wheels. A square top set over the house.

It also should be of note that, in the majority of Europe, fixed stages were more common than wagons, and the sites of the fixed stages varied from place to place. In Rome the ancient amphitheatres were used, and in places like Mons, France, and Frankfurt-am-Main in Germany, town squares were the primary auditorium.

== Pageant wagons in practice ==
When a processional cycle play came to town, the whole city was used as a massive auditorium as the wagons were moved through the main streets of the city. The wagons would stop at key locations, where the scene of each wagon would then begin. For instance, the starting wagon would take up a position before the mayor’s house and perform the first scene. When the scene ended, the wagon would move on to the next appointed spot and repeat the performance. Meanwhile, all along the predetermined route other wagons with their many varied scenes would follow in procession, each playing over and over its part in the slowly unfolding cycle. It was a chain theatre. It is said that the bigger wagons can be likened the elaborate floats in the New Orleans Mardi Gras Parade.

When in the country, the wagons were lined up in stationary ranks, and the audience moved from one to another to follow the cycle. The performers did not limit themselves to the small playing space of the wagon settings, but spread out freely onto the surrounding ground.

Each wagon contained a setting and carried the actors to different scenes. As the actors moved, the members of the audience moved with them. In some cases simultaneous action occurred on a number of levels of wagon platforms. This offered a spectacle quite like that of a modern-day three-ring circus. If a town had a large enough field nearby the wagons were sometimes set all in one spot as to minimize movement. No mode of performance in the history of drama has ever occupied more territory.

The Archdeacon Roberts is also quoted in the movement of the carts throughout the towns;

"They begane first at the abay gates, and when the firste paginate was played it was wheeled to the highe crosse before the mayor, and so to every streete; and soe every streete had a pagiant playinge before them at one time, till all the pagiantes for the daye appointed weare played: and when one pagiant was neere ended, worde was broughte from streete to streete, and soe they mighte come in place thereof excedinge orderlye, and all the streetes have theire pagiantes afore them all at one time playeinge together; to se which playes was greate resorte, and also scafoldes and stages made in the streetes in those places where they determined to playe thire pagiantes."

As the productions regarding these plays grew, towns all over Europe began to adapt and create productions of their own. The Europeans thoroughly enjoyed the elaborate spectacle, and each year they outdid themselves in the creation of such productions. It reached such a point that entire towns were in on the creation of these dramas, and specific guilds were created to devote themselves to the undertaking of the pageant construction. If performed today, this spectacle would tax the resources of any large country town. It would deplete most of the stock of a local lumber yard, hardware store and dry goods outlet. It would also require all the available blacksmiths and carpenters to devote an entire month to the creation of the wagons.
