= Cinematic techniques =

List of methods used in filmmaking

This article contains a list of cinematic techniques that are divided into categories and briefly described.

== Basic definitions of terms ==
180-degree rule
A continuity editorial technique in which sequential shots of two or more actors within a scene are all shot with the camera on one side of the two actors so that a coherent spatial relationship and eyeline match are maintained.
Airborne shot
A shot taken from an aerial device, generally while moving. This technique has gained popularity in recent years due to the popularity and growing availability of drones.
Arc
A dolly shot where the camera moves in an arc along a circular or elliptical radius in relation to the subject ("arc left" or "arc right")
Backlighting (lighting design)
The main source of light is behind the subject, silhouetting it, and directed toward the camera.
Bridging shot
A shot used to cover a jump in time or place or other discontinuity. Examples are a clock face showing advancing time, falling calendar pages, railroad wheels, newspaper headlines and seasonal changes. Bridge shots are also used to avoid jump cuts when inserting a pick-up.
Camera angle
The point of view or viewing position adopted by the camera with respect to its subject. Most common types are
- High-angle shot (the camera is higher than its subject)
- Low-angle shot (the camera is lower than its subject)
Close-up
A frame depicting the human head or an object of similar size.
Cut
An editorial transition signified by the immediate replacement of one shot with another.
Cross-cutting
Cutting between different events occurring simultaneously in different locations. Especially in narrative filmmaking, cross-cutting is traditionally used to build suspense or to suggest a thematic relationship between two sets of actions.
Continuity editing
An editorial style that preserves the illusion of undisrupted time and space across editorial transitions (especially cuts).
Deep focus
A technique in which objects in the extreme foreground and objects in the extreme background are kept equally in focus.
Dissolve
An editorial transition overlapping a fade in and a fade out in such a way that one image gradually disappears while another simultaneously emerges. This transition generally suggest a longer period of narrative elapses than is suggested by cuts.
Camera dolly
A wheeled cart or similar device upon which a movie camera is mounted to give it smooth, horizontal mobility.

Dollying or Dolly shot
A shot in which the camera moves horizontally either toward or away from its subject, or right or left in relation to the subject. Traditionally dolly shots are filmed from a camera dolly but the same motion may also be performed with a Steadicam, gimbal, etc. A dolly shot is generally described in terms of "dollying in" or "dollying out". Also known as trucking in and out, or right and left.
Dolly zoom
A powerful and dramatic effect produced by simultaneously trucking in or out while synchronously zooming out or in.
Editing
The selection and organization of shots into a series, usually in the interest of creating larger cinematic units. Adding music is also a great way to make it more cinematic
Ellipsis (linguistics)
A term referring to "chunks" of time left out of a narrative, signaled in filmmaking by editorial transitions
Establishing shot
A shot, often a long shot, usually placed at the beginning of a scene to establish the general location of the specific action to follow. This shot is also known as an Extreme Long Shot.
Eyeline match
A type of continuity editorial match involving two or more, sequential shots in which the preceding shot contains an agent (a person, animal, etc.) gazing in the direction of some unseen, off-screen vision, and following shot(s) contains an image presumed by the spectator to be the object of the agent's gaze. This technique is an important consideration in dialogues where actors are talking to each other. (Contrast with Over the shoulder shot; See also 180 degree rule)
Extreme close-up
A shot framed so closely as to show only a portion of the face or of some object.
Extreme long shot
A shot in which the human figure would be extremely insignificant compared to its surroundings.
A panoramic view photographed from a considerable distance and made up essentially of landscape or distant background.
Fade in/out
An editorial transition in which the image either gradually appears out of ("fade in") or gradually fades into ("fade out") a black screen.
Fill light
An auxiliary light placed to the side of the subject that softens shadows and illuminates areas not lit by the key light (see "key light").
Flashback
A scene or sequence inserted into a scene set in the narrative present that images some event set in the past.
Flashforward
A scene or sequence inserted into a scene set in the narrative present that images some event set in the future.
Focus
The optical clarity or precision of an image relative to normal human vision. Focus in photographic images is usually expressed in terms of depth.
Framing
The placement of subjects and other visual content with respect to the boundaries of the image.
Hand-held shot
A shot where the camera is hand-carried, either with or without a Steadicam. If done without a steadicam, the effect is a shaky image which conveys an amateurish or urgent affect.
Inter-title
A piece of filmed, printed text edited into the midst of (i.e., inter-) the photographed action at various points. Most commonly used in silent movies to convey elements of dialogue and other commentary.
Iris in/out
An editorial transition popular during the silent period utilizing a diaphragm placed in front of the lens and which, when opened (iris in) or closed (iris out), functions like a fade in or fade out. A partially opened iris can also be used to focus attention on a detail of the scene in the manner of vignetting.
Jump cut
An editorial transition between two shots in which the illusion of temporal continuity is radically disrupted.
Key light
The main light on a subject, usually placed at a 45 degree angle to the camera-subject axis. In high-key lighting, the key light provides all or most of the light in the scene. In low-key lighting, the key light provides much less of the total illumination.
Long shot
A shot in which the human figure would be relatively insignificant compared to its surroundings.
Master shot
A shot, often a medium shot or longer, which shows all the important action in a scene. In editing, the master can be used to a greater or lesser extent as the 'skeleton' of the edit, which is fleshed out by replacing parts of the master with tighter coverage such as closeups and cutaways.
Match cut
One of various editorial devices used to preserve a sense of spatio-temporal integrity or continuity between cuts.
Medium close-up
A shot depicting the human figure from approximately the chest up.
Medium shot
A shot depicting the human figure from approximately the waist up.
Mise en scène
Everything that has been placed in front of or is revealed by the camera while shooting.
Over the shoulder shot
A shot where the camera is placed above the back of the shoulder and head of a subject. This shot is most commonly used to present conversational back and forth between two subjects. With the camera placed behind one character, the shot then frames the sequence from the perspective of that character
Pan
A shot in which the camera is made to pivot horizontally left or right (about its vertical axis) while filming. Pans are always described in terms of "panning left" or "panning right". It is incorrect to discuss pans in terms of vertical, "up"/"down" movement, which is properly called tilting.
Point of view shot
(Often abbreviated as 'POV'). A shot which shows an image from the specific point of view of a character in the film.
Racking focus
A shot employing shallow focus in which the focal distance changes so that the background is gradually brought into focus while the foreground is gradually taken out of focus or visa versa.
Reverse angle
In a dialogue scene, a shot of the second participant understood as the opposing or "reverse" view of the shot showing the first participant.
Scene
A unit of narration generally composed of a series of shots that takes place in a single location and concerns a central action.
Shot
- 1.) The image produced by a motion picture camera from the time it begins shooting until the time it stops shooting.
- 2.) (in an edited film) the uninterrupted record of time and space depicted between editorial transitions.
Static Frame
The camera focus and angle stay completely still, usually with a locked off tripod, and the scene continues motion. Not to be confused with a still frame where the scene is also static or frozen.
Steadicam
A lightweight, highly-mobile camera transportation and stabilization device developed by inventor / cinematographer Garrett Brown which permits hand-held filming with an image steadiness comparable to tracking or dolly shots. The device involves 1.) a vest redistributing the weight of the camera to the hips of the cameraman and, 2.) a spring-loaded arm working to minimize the effects of camera movement. A video tap simultaneously frees the camera operator from the eyepiece, who is then free to travel through any walkable terrain while filming.
Story board
A series of drawings and captions (sometimes resembling a comic strip) that shows the planned shot divisions and camera movements of the film.
Tilt
A shot in which the camera is made to pivot vertically up or down (about its horizontal transverse axis) while filming.
Tracking shot/traveling shot
A shot in which the camera moves alongside or parallel to its subject. Traditionally tracking shots are filmed while the camera is mounted on a track dolly and rolled on dedicated tracks comparable to railroad tracks, In recent years, however, parallel camera moves performed with a Steadicam, gimbal, etc. may also be called a tracking shot. Tracking shots often "follow" a subject while it is in motion: for instance, a person walking on a sidewalk seen from the perspective of somebody walking on a parallel path several feet away. Shots taken from moving vehicles that run parallel to another moving object are also referred to as tracking or traveling shots. A tracking shot may also be curved, moving around its subject in a semi-circular rotation, known specifically as an arc or arc shot.

Truck
Truck-right, truck-left, truck-in, truck-out (see Dolly shot)
Two shot
A shot in which the frame encompasses two people, typically but not exclusively a medium shot.
Whip pan
A type of pan shot in which the camera pans so quickly that the resulting image is badly blurred. It is sometimes used as an editorial transition and is also known as a swish pan or "flash pan."
Whip zoom
An unusually quick but continuous zoom in or out.
Wipe
An optical editorial transition in which an image appears to be pushed or "wiped" to one aside of the screen to make way for the next.
Zoom
A shot taken from a stationary position using a special zoom lens that magnifies or de-magnifies the center of the image. This creates an illusion that the camera is moving toward or away from its subject by making the subject more or less prominent in the frame. Not to be confused with dollying in which the camera itself actually physically moves closer to or further away from its subject.

== Cinematography ==
=== Movement and expression ===
Movement can be used extensively by film makers to make meaning. It is how a scene is put together to produce an image. A famous example of this, which uses "dance" extensively to communicate meaning and emotion, is the film, West Side Story.

Provided in this alphabetized list of film techniques used in motion picture filmmaking. There are a variety of expressions:

- Aerial perspective
- Aerial shot
- American shot
- Angle of view
- Bird's eye shot
- Bird's-eye view
- Boom shot
- B-roll
- Camera angle
- Camera coverage
- Camera dolly
- Camera operator
- Camera tracking
- Close-up
- Crane shot
- Dolly zoom
- Dutch angle
- Establishing shot
- Film frame
- Filmmaking
- Follow shot
- Forced perspective
- Freeze-frame shot
- Full frame
- Full shot
- Hanging miniature
- Head shot
- High-angle shot
- Long shot
- Long take
- Low-angle shot
- Master shot
- Medium shot
- Money shot
- Multiple-camera setup
- One shot (music video)
- Over the shoulder shot
- Panning (camera)
- Point of view shot
- Rack focusing
- Reaction shot
- Shaky camera
- Shot (filmmaking)
- Shot reverse shot
- Single-camera setup
- SnorriCam
- Stalker vision
- Tilt (camera)
- Top-down perspective
- Tracking shot
- Trunk shot
- Two shot
- Video production
- Walk and talk
- Whip pan
- Worm's-eye view

== Lighting technique and aesthetics ==
- Background lighting
- Cameo lighting
- Fill light
- Flood lighting
- High-key lighting
- Key lighting
- Lens flare
- Low-key lighting
- Mood lighting
- Rembrandt lighting
- Stage lighting
- Soft light

To achieve the results mentioned above, a Lighting Director may use a number or combination of Video Lights. These may include the Redhead or Open-face unit, The Fresnel Light, which gives you a little more control over the spill, or The Dedolight, which provides a more efficient light output and a beam which is easier to control.

== Editing and transitional devices ==
- A-roll
- B-roll
- Cross-cutting
- Cutaway
- Dissolve
- Establishing shot
- Fast cutting
- Flashback
- Insert
- J cut ("split edit")
- Jump cut
- Keying
- L cut ("split edit")
- Master shot
- Match cut
- Montage
- Point of view shot
- Screen direction
- Sequence shot
- Smash cut
- Slow cutting
- Split screen
- SMPTE timecode
- Shot reverse shot
- Wipe

== Special effects (FX) ==
- 3D computer graphics
- 3D film for movie history
- Bluescreen/Chroma key
- Bullet time
- Computer-generated imagery
- Digital compositing
- Optical effects
- Stereoscopy for 3D technical details
- Stop motion
- Stop trick

== Sound ==
Sound is used extensively in filmmaking to enhance presentation, and is distinguished into diegetic and non-diegetic sound:

- Diegetic sound is heard by both the characters and audience. Also called "literal sound" or "actual sound". Examples include
  - Voices of characters;
  - Sounds made by objects in the story, e.g. heart beats of a person
  - Source music, represented as coming from instruments in the story space.
  - Basic sound effects, e.g. dog barking, car passing; as it is in the scene
  - Music coming from reproduction devices such as record players, radios, tape players etc.
- Non-diegetic sound is represented as coming from a source outside the story space, i.e. its source is neither visible on the screen, nor has been implied to be present in the action. Also called "non-literal sound" or "commentary sound". Examples include:
  - Narrator's commentary;
  - Sound effects added for dramatic effect;
  - Mood music
  - Film score

=== Sound effects ===
In motion picture and television production, a sound effect is a sound recorded and presented to make a specific storytelling or creative point, without the use of dialogue or music. The term often refers to a process, applied to a recording, without necessarily referring to the recording itself. In professional motion picture and television production, the segregations between recordings of dialogue, music, and sound effects can be quite distinct, and it is important to understand that in such contexts, dialogue, and music recordings are never referred to as sound effects, though the processes applied to them, such as reverberation or flanging, often are. Necessary incidental units of sound, footsteps, keys, a polishing sound, are created in a Foley studio.

== Techniques in interactive movies ==
New techniques currently being developed in interactive movies, introduce an extra dimension into the experience of viewing movies, by allowing the viewer to change the course of the movie.

In traditional linear movies, the author can carefully construct the plot, roles, and characters to achieve a specific effect on the audience. Interactivity, however, introduces non-linearity into the movie, such that the author no longer has complete control over the story, but must now share control with the viewer. There is an inevitable trade-off between the desire of the viewer for freedom to experience the movie in different ways, and the desire of the author to employ specialized techniques to control the presentation of the story. Computer technology is required to create the illusion of freedom for the viewer, while providing familiar, as well as, new cinematic techniques to the author.

== See also ==
- Glossary of motion picture terms
- Film industry
- Outline of film
