= Medium shot =

Medium-distance camera shot

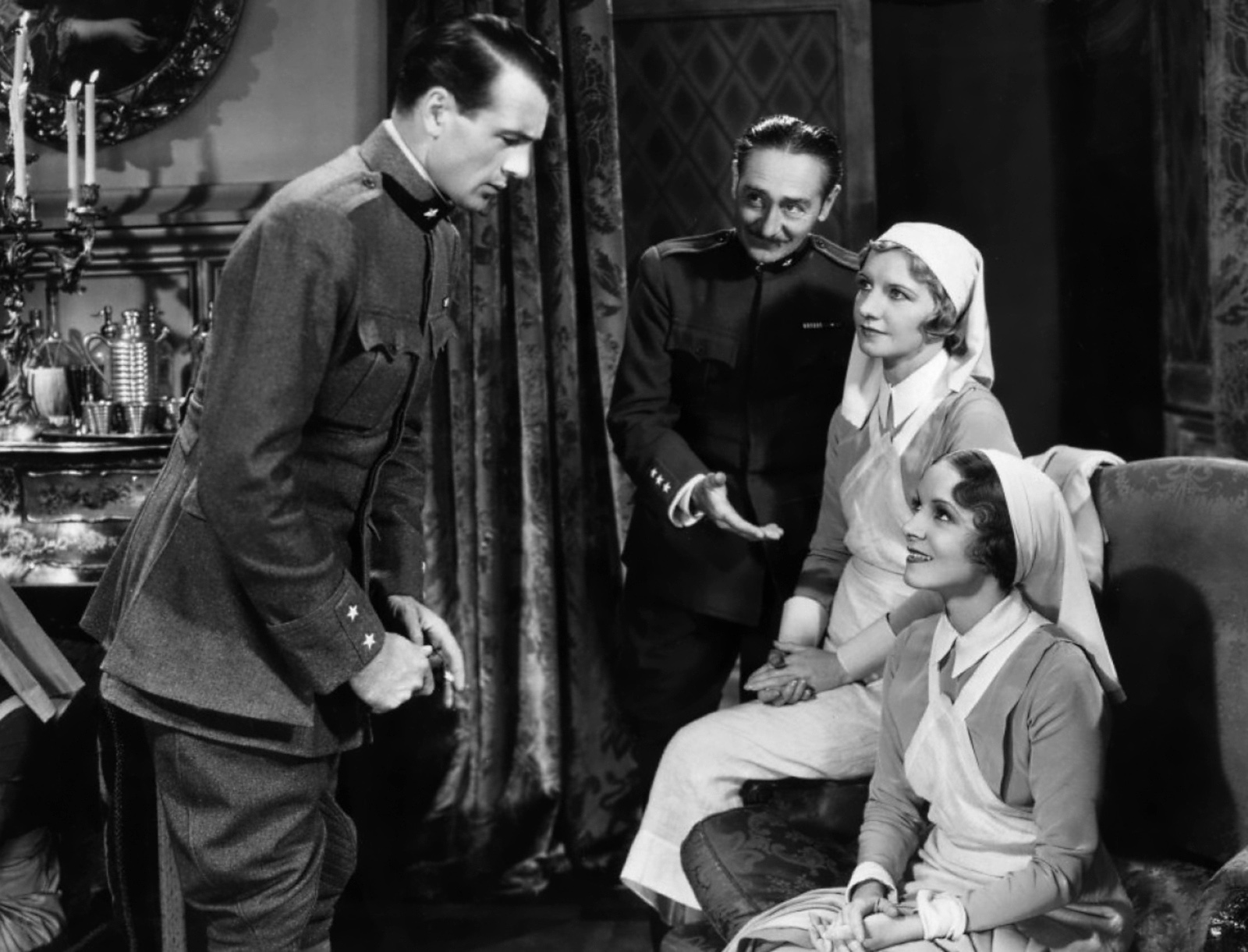
An example of a medium group shot featuring Gary Cooper and Adolphe Menjou from the 1932 drama film A Farewell to Arms

In a movie a medium shot, mid shot (MS), or waist shot is a camera angle shot from a medium distance.

== Use ==
Medium shots are favored in sequences where dialogues or a small group of people are acting, as they give the viewer a partial view of the background, such as when the shot is 'cutting the person in half' and also show the subjects' facial expressions in the context of their body language. Medium shots are also used when the subject in the shot is delivering information, such as news presenters. It is also used in interviews. It is the most common shot in movies, and it usually follows the first establishing shots of a new scene or location.

A normal lens that sees what the human eye sees is usually used for medium shots.

== Definition ==
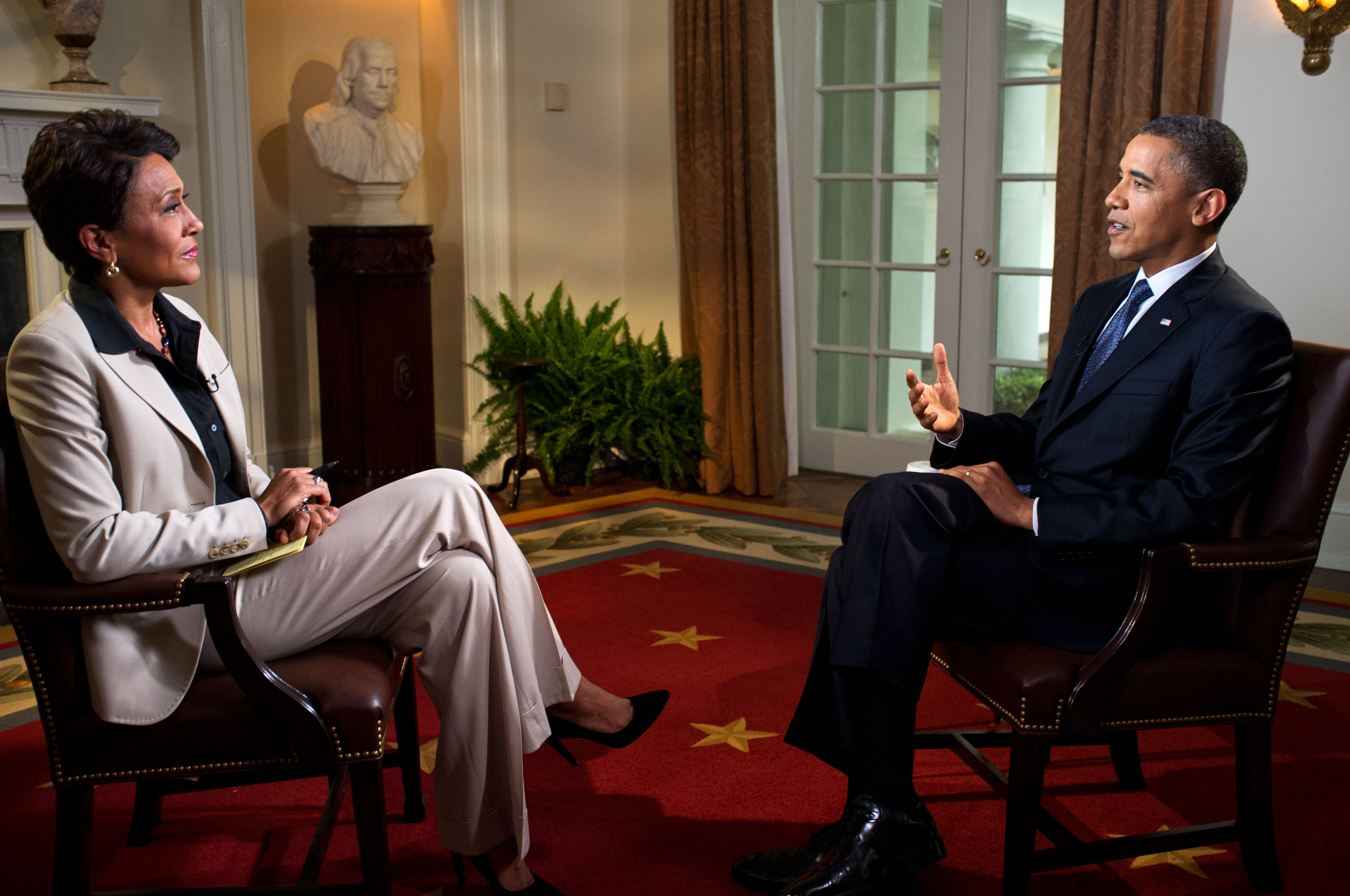
A medium two-shot of Robin Roberts interviewing Barack Obama

The medium shot shows equality between subjects and background. The dividing line between what constitutes a long shot and medium shot is not definite, nor is the line between medium shot and close-up. In some standard texts and professional references, a full-length view of a human subject is called a medium shot; in this terminology, a shot of the person from the knees up or the waist up is a close-up shot. In other texts, these partial views are called medium shots. In principle, the medium shot is what can be seen with the human eye in a single quick glance and convey all the action taking place in that field of view.

== Types ==
Medium shots are divided into singles (a waist-high shot of one actor), group shots, over-the shoulders or two-shots (featuring two people). A medium wide shot, or American shot, shows a bit more of the background but is still close enough for facial expressions to be seen, although these facial expressions would be better seen in a waist-high shot.

== See also ==
- Camera angle
- Camera operator
- Close-up
- Dutch angle
- Establishing shot
- High-angle shot
- Long shot
- Low-angle shot
- Mise-en-scène
- Over the shoulder shot
- Two shot
- Video production
- Videographer
