= Oblique Angle =

Oblique angle may refer to:

- An angle which is not a multiple of 90°
- Another word for "Dutch angle" in cinematography
