= Master shot =

Camera angle that shows the whole scene

A master shot (or short master) is a film recording of an entire dramatized scene, start to finish, from a camera angle that keeps all the players in view. It is often a long shot and can sometimes perform a double function as an establishing shot. Usually, the master shot is the first shot checked off during the shooting of a scene. It is the foundation of what is called camera coverage, other shots that reveal different aspects of the action, groupings of two or three of the actors at crucial moments, close-ups of individuals, insert shots of various props, and so on.

Historically, the master shot was the most important shot of any given scene. All shots in a given scene were somehow related to what was happening in the master shot. This is one reason that some of the films from the 1930s and the 1940s are considered "stagey" by today's standards. By the 1960s and the 1970s, the style of film shooting and editing shifted to include radical angles that conveyed more subjectivity and intimacy within the scenes. Today, the master shot is still a key element of film production, but scenes are not built around the master shot in the same way that they were when professional filmmaking was in its infancy.
