= Over-the-shoulder shot =

Camera angle used in film and television

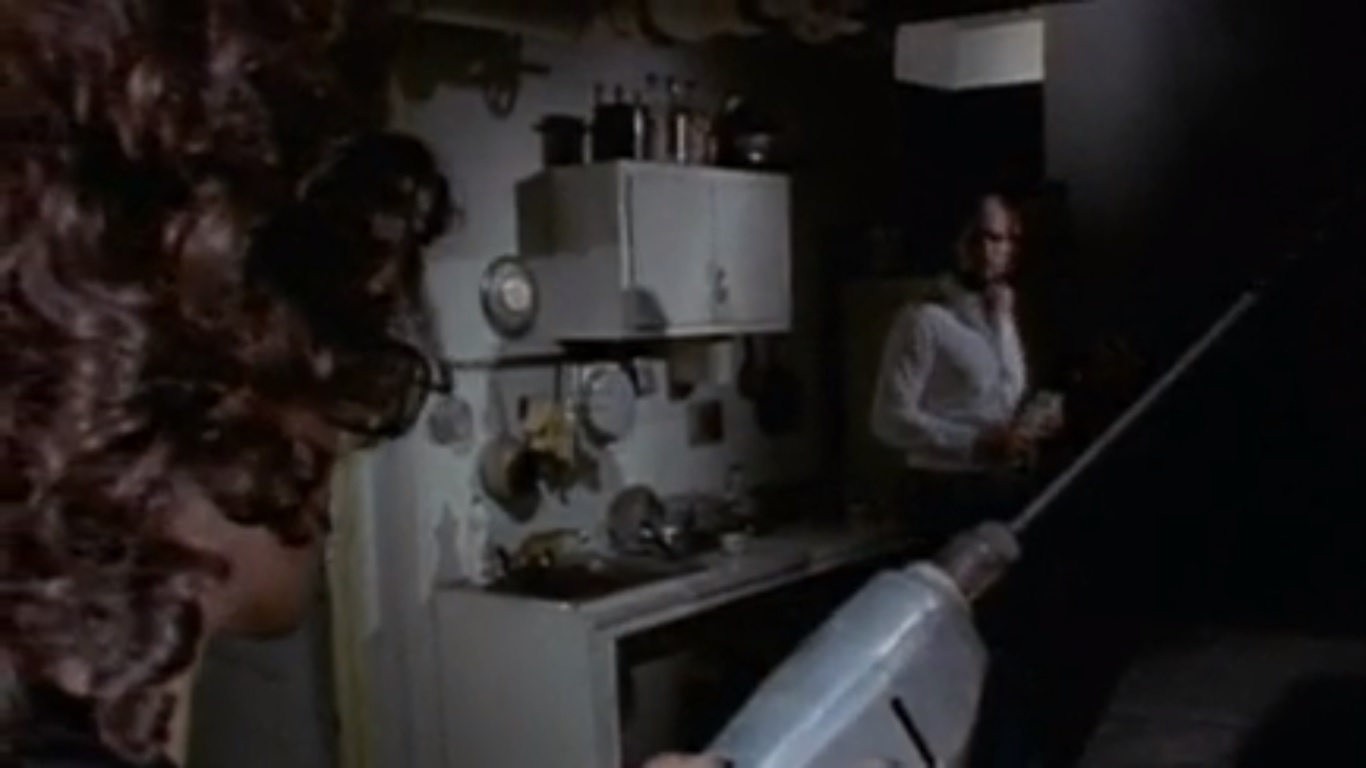
Over-the-shoulder shot from The Driller Killer (1979)

The over-the-shoulder shot (OTS or short over) is a camera angle used in film and television, where the camera is placed above the back of the shoulder and head of a subject. This shot is most commonly used to present conversational back and forth between two subjects. With the camera placed behind one character, the shot then frames the sequence from the perspective of that character. The over-the-shoulder shot is then utilised in a shot-reverse-shot sequence where both subject's OTS perspectives are edited consecutively to create a back and forth interplay, capturing dialogue and reactions. This inclusion of the back of the shoulder allows audiences to understand the spatial relationships between two subjects, while still being able to capture a closer shot of each subject’s facial expression. In film and television, the filmmaker or cinematographer’s choice of an OTS shot’s camera height, the use of focus and lenses affect the way audiences interpret subjects and their relationships to others and space.

== History ==
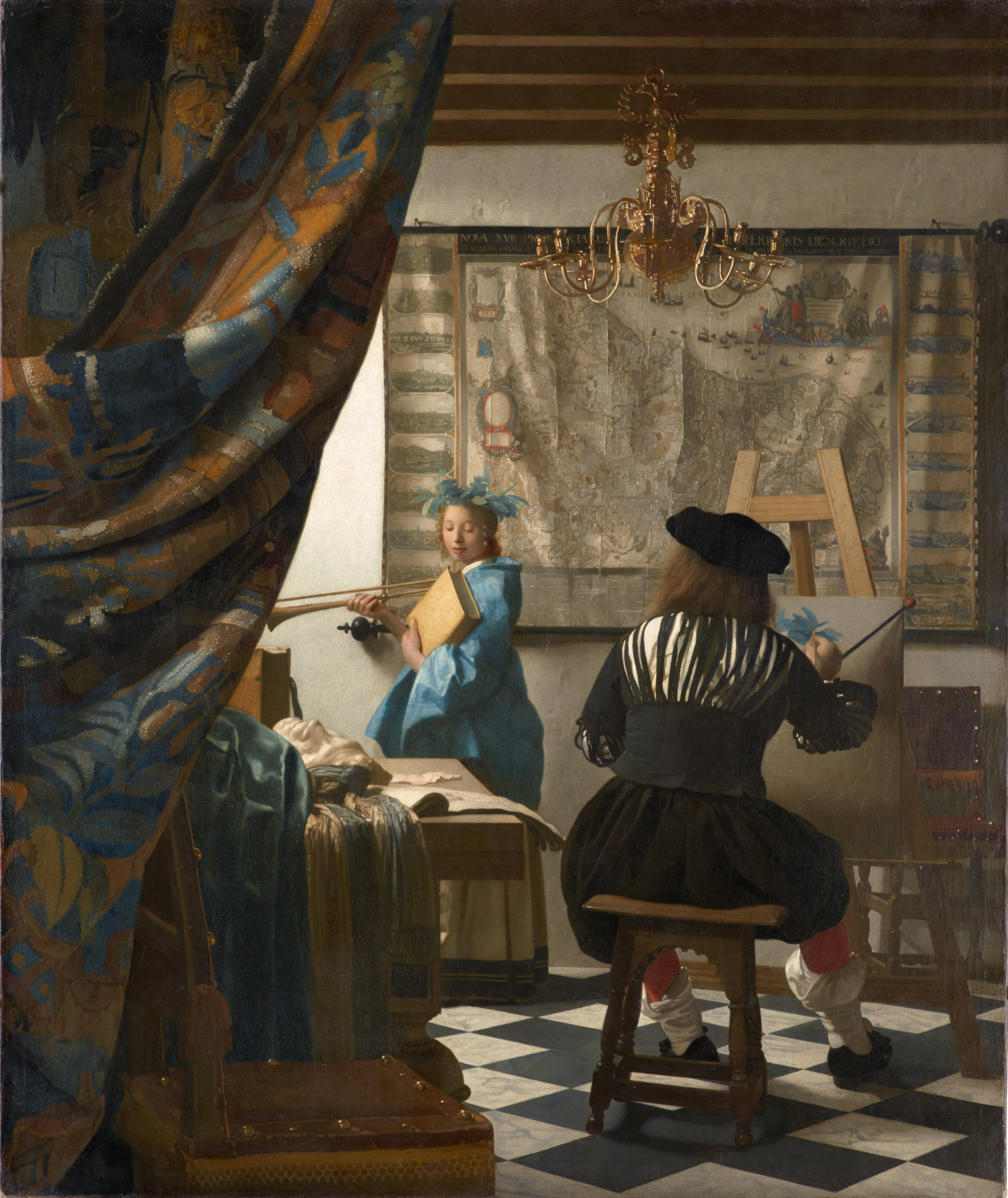
Johannes Vermeer, The art of painting, 1666–1668. 120 × 100 cm (47 × 39 in). Kunsthistorisches Museum, Vienna

The over-the-shoulder angle was employed in numerous artworks before the invention of photography or film making. The art of painting, by the Dutch painter Johannes Vermeer uses the OTS angle and was created between 1666–1668. It is considered one of the earliest appearances of the angle, which is said to include a self-portrait of the artist himself from behind. Similarly, nineteenth-century German romantic painter Caspar David Fredrich's artwork Moonrise over the sea, painted in 1822, depicts three rear facing figures looking out to sea. The OTS perspective captured in the artwork was common amongst Fredrich’s works and allowed audiences to identify with the figures in the painting, as they participated in the same visual experience as the subjects in frame.

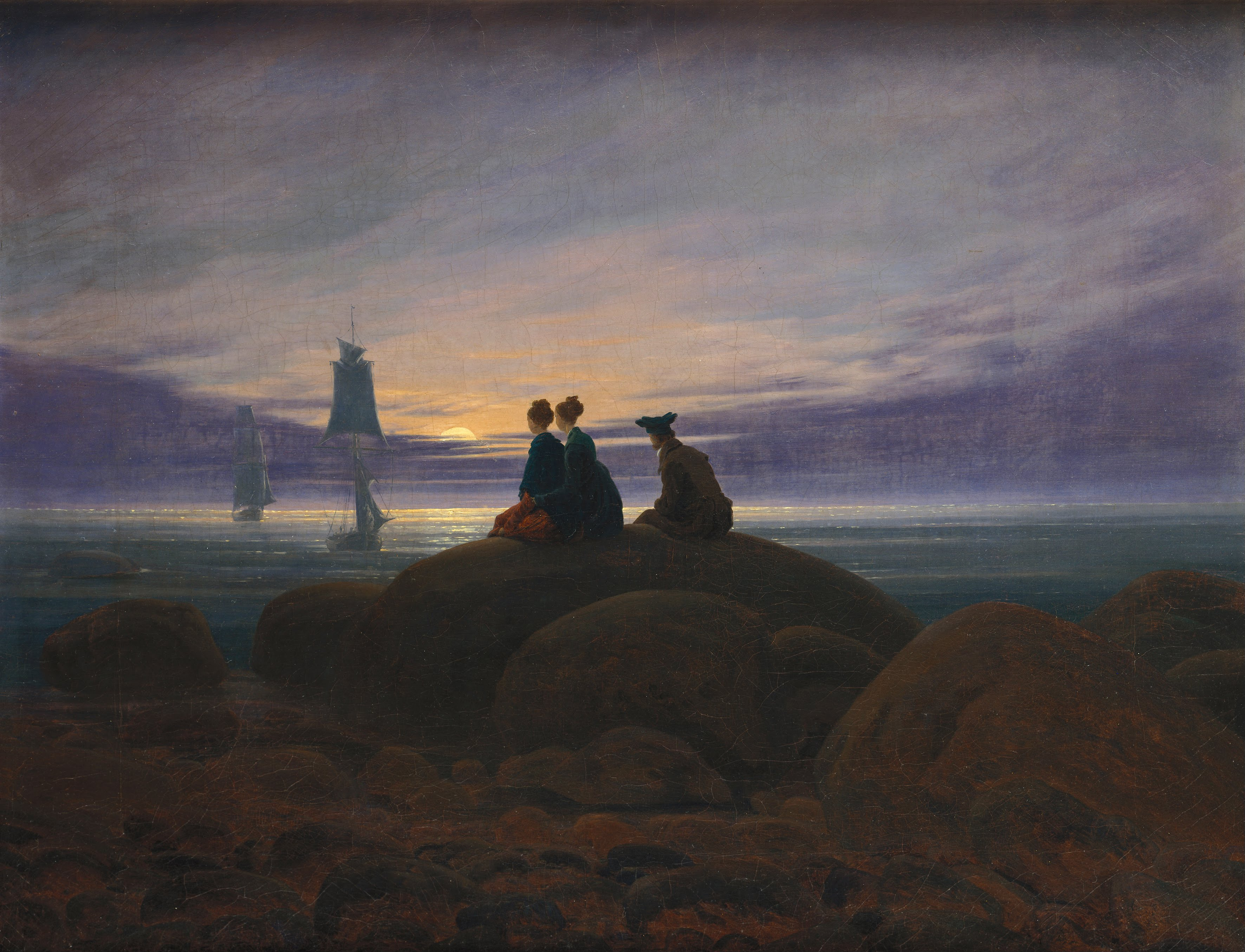
Caspar David Friedrich, Moonrise over the Sea (Mondaufgang am Meer), 1822. 55 × 71 cm (22 × 28 in). Alte Nationalgalerie, Berlin

In the early years of silent film making, cameras were kept stationary and distant from the action, mirroring the position an audience would be viewing a stage production. The blocking and staging of scenes in early film was heavily influenced by theatrical conventions. For example, "cheating out", which meant to face outward towards an audience more than would be natural. This technique was utilised by filmmakers to position both subjects towards the camera, during a conversational scene, in order to capture the front and side profiles of both subjects, rather than turning away from the camera.

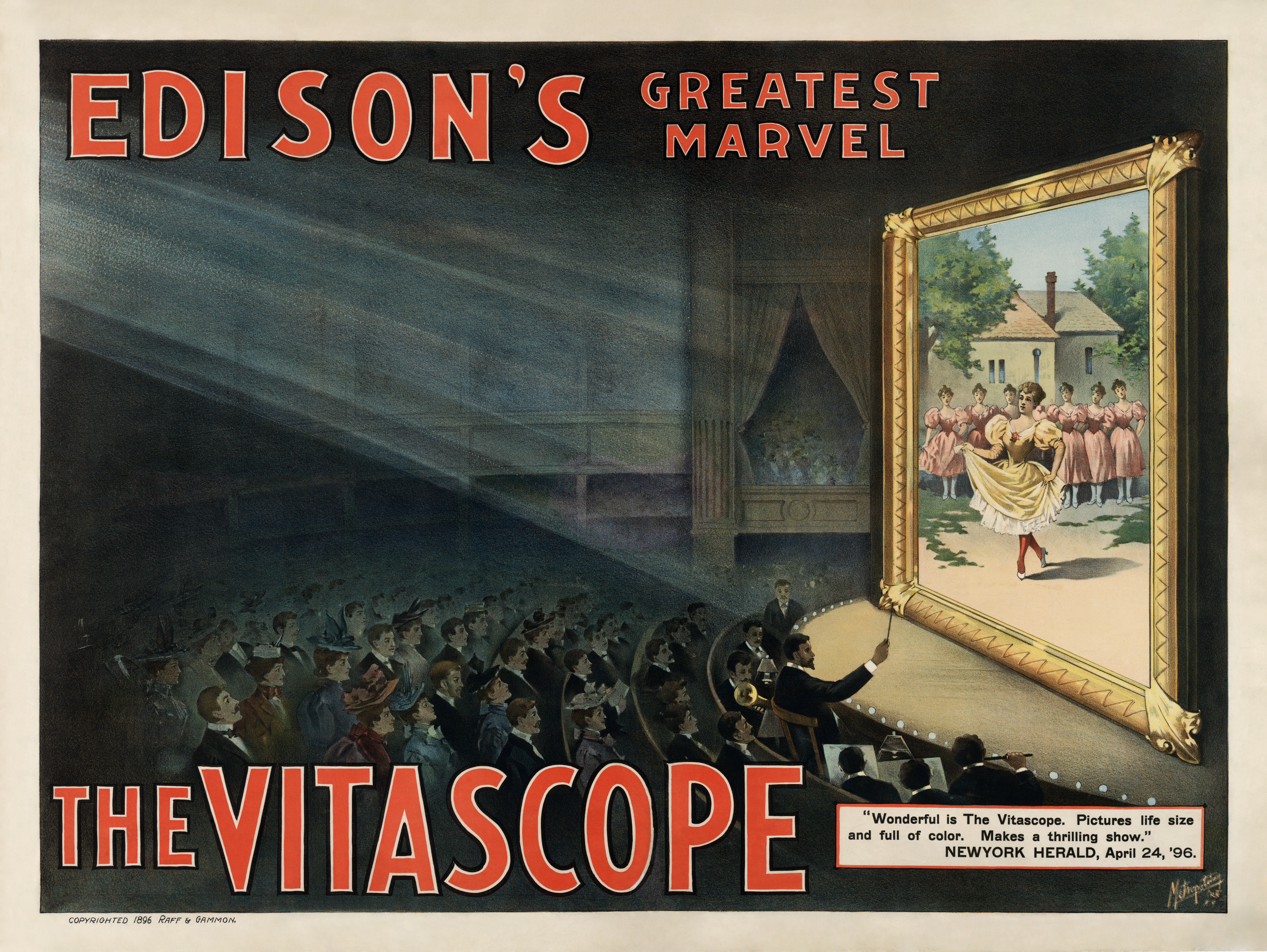
1896 poster advertising the Vitascope–an early film projector first demonstrated in 1895

By the early 20th century, films had evolved from static one shot takes to longer form films that utilised multiple camera angles and multiple shots within a scene and setting. James Williamson’s Attack on a China Mission Station, made in 1900, used the first reverse angle cut in film history. With the introduction of cutting and multiple shots being used for one scene, actors no longer had to "cheat out" towards the camera. Instead, the subjects could face one another and the filmmaker could capture conversation in two reverse over-the-shoulder shots from both subject’s perspectives. The technological improvements in cameras also meant they were smaller, lighter, could be moved far closer to subjects and have a greater range in controlling light, exposure and focus.

== Practical application ==
An OTS is composed, when used to capture dialogue, to make the subject facing the camera the shot’s focal point. A conventional OTS shot always has at least three layers of depth: the foreground, middle ground and background. The inclusion of a subject’s shoulder, and often the back of their head in the foreground, adds depth to the frame. Because an object appears bigger when it is closer to the camera than they do when viewed at a greater distance, objects and subjects appear different sizes on screen which increases viewers sense of the depth of the space depicted. This occurs because the filmmaker has placed the subject as an overlapping object along the Z-axis of the frame, the Z-axis meaning the imaginary line that runs from the foreground to the background of a shot.

This schematic shows the axis between two characters and the 180° arc on which cameras may be positioned (green). When cutting from the green arc to the red arc, the characters switch places on the screen, potentially confusing the viewer. In conventional filmmaking this confusion is avoided by not crossing the line.

To capture a turn-taking conversation, this OTS is then flipped to a reverse OTS angle that depicts the other subject’s perspective. Edited together, the interplay of these two shots often depicts a first subjects’ action and a second subject’s corresponding reaction. This sequence of two OTS shots that depict a back and forth between two subjects is called a shot-reverse-shot. Filmmakers aim to ‘match’ the OTS shots within a shot-reverse-shot in order to ensure spatial continuity so audiences quickly understand the physical distance between the two subjects, and their physical distance to the space around them. "Matching" means the two people involved remain on the same sides of the shot. For these shots to ‘match’, filmmakers may take into consideration the 180-degree rule, which dictates that the camera should be kept on one side of an imaginary axis between two characters. Similarly the 30 degree rule is also used, which specifies that if two shots of the same character or object are cut together, the viewpoints must be at least 30 degrees away from each other or entail significantly different shot sizes. This problem can be avoided by inserting a different shot between the two similar shots. Filmmakers also aim to create an eye line match, within conventional OTS shot-reverse sequences, to match the angle of the subject’s eye line with its corresponding position in the next shot. These rules dictate the placement of the camera and their direction to ensure spatial continuity. This tradition of ‘matching’ shots allows viewers to, often unconsciously, cognitively piece together the different camera angles and, with the inclusion of a subjects shoulder, positions the subject’s physical perspective clearly to then interact with the focal subject.

The use of alternating over the shoulder shots contrasts with the use of single person shots during a conversation, with one person shown then the other, then the first, then the second, etc., throughout a conversation. This method does not establish a spatial relationship between the two persons. (In fact, the two speakers in this kind of sequence can be filmed days or months apart because the two actors are not shown together.) The two methods often are combined in a sequence, however.

The over-the-shoulder camera angle is also simulated in third-person shooter video games. Within this category of 3D gaming the player’s avatar is visible on screen, as opposed to a first-person shooter game that centres the weapon in the frame and adopts a point-of-view immersive angle. The OTS angle is utilised in third-person shooter games as a way to allow both game designers and players to further customise the avatar characters and to display a greater range of vision of the surrounding area. This increase in a player’s field of vision allows for clearer close combat and interaction with physical objects in the game space. The OTS angle was popularized in third-person video games by Resident Evil 4 (2005).

== Technology ==
To capture an OTS shot, a wide angle, normal or telephoto lens can be used. The type of lens a cinematographer may decide to use for a shot depends on the distance they want to create between the subject and the camera or subject in the foreground. In a conventional presentation of an OTS shot, the image is captured with a normal lens, with a very short camera to subject distance and a shallow depth of field in the foreground and background, leaving the main subject in sharp focus. A shallow depth of field is created when there is a small area in an image that is in focus, while the background is blurred, leaving only the subject in focus. This effect is achieved by increasing the camera's aperture or by decreasing the cameras f number.

Computer technology is being developed to accurately classify shot types in film and television. Within an SVM learning machine, human presence detectors and context saliency mapping technologies have been combined to analyse all the visual data presented in a shot in order to identify its setup. The OTS is one of the more difficult camera angles to classify, using these human presence recognition technologies, as the subject with their back to the camera isn’t easily detected as a human. This occurs because the image lacks face, upper body or full body classifiers the computer requires to determine a human presence. The continued improvement of this computer technology aims to increase the ‘visual saliency’ of the presence of actors on screen even when they are shown only partially and from behind, as in an OTS shot.

== Interpretation ==
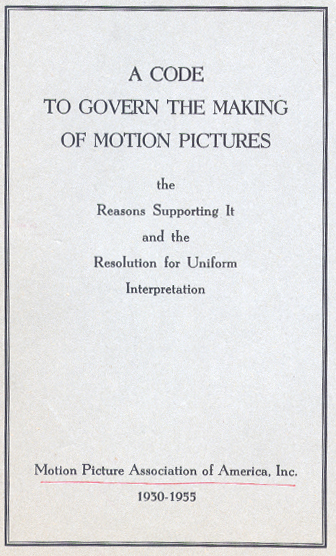
Motion Picture Production Code (1930–1955)

The OTS shot is used as a way to capture the perspective of the subject whose shoulder the camera is placed behind. This technique can often be used to manipulate the level of identification an audience has with a character or can display a relationship dynamic between two characters on screen. This is achieved by controlling the camera’s angle in relation to the subject in focus. Similarly, the duration of a shot of one perspective more than another may lead an audience to further relate to one subject over another. This may be because the audience shares one subject’s perspective more often or contrastingly, if shown one subject as a focal point more often an audience may further identify with them. The more the camera matches the eye-line of the shot’s subject can also be a way in which audiences interpret relationships between characters or change their level of identification with one subject over another. As the OTS is so heavily used in film and television, breaking the ‘rules’ of the OTS is often an unconscious marker to audiences of a shift in mood or tone due to the discontinuity.

It has also been suggested that the OTS shot had been used to depict homosexual kissing in order to surpass production codes of the time. This angle was utilised as characters could be shot from behind and therefore filmmakers could infer a kiss hidden from the view of the camera, rather than capturing the kiss from a straight-on angle. The Motion Picture Production Code, often referred to as the "Hays Code" after its creator Will H. Hays, stated "no picture shall be produced which will lower the moral standards of those who see it. Hence the sympathy of the audience shall never be thrown to the side of crime, wrongdoing, evil, or sin". The production code also referred to the depiction of homosexual intimacy on screen specifying "sex perversion or any inference of it is forbidden". Despite the production code’s abandonment by the late 1960s, the over-the-shoulder shot continually is used to obscure intimacy between same sex couples. This use of the OTS shot in television especially, combined with quick editing cuts, works to minimise the impact of same sex intimacy. This film making technique presents a "blink-and-you-missed-it peck in the corner of the screen, unassuming and un-obstructive" in order to maintain a broad viewership and network support.

== Examples ==
An example of the use of an OTS for dramatic effect is throughout Robert Zemeckis’s Back to the Future (1985) to show the dynamic between Marty McFly (the film's main character) and Biff (a bully). The differing camera angles used in their exchanges depict the power imbalance between the two characters. When capturing Marty as the subject from Biff’s perspective, he is shown from a high angle shot, as if Biff is physically and symbolically looking down on Marty. In the reverse shot, then capturing Biff as the subject from Marty’s perspective, he is shown from a low angle shot, positioning the camera from Marty’s viewpoint looking up at Biff.

A single shot example of the OTS shot occurs in Citizen Kane. Cinematographer Gregg Toland uses a specially-made wide-angle lens with a very deep depth of field to get sharp focus from three feet from the camera to 25 feet away, which seems further because of the wide-angle lens. In the scene, Kane is preparing to sign away control of his fortune because of financial reverses. The right side of the shot is filled with the left shoulder and left side of Bernstein, Kane's former protector, reading the terms of the agreement. Sitting across a table from him and signing the agreement is Thatcher, Kane's banker, who is made to appear much smaller in the shot. Across the room, Kane paces back and forth, moving to and from the table, before he finally comes to the table and signs the agreement.

A film that breaks the rules of the OTS is Matteo Garrone’s Gomorrah (2008) which always does not have a matched reversed shot. The focus is also often kept on the foreground instead of the middle ground, with the subject the camera is facing deliberately out of focus. This is demonstrated throughout the film as a way to convey a sense of mystery and instability by confusing the films continuity.
