= Follow focus =

Camera focus control mechanism

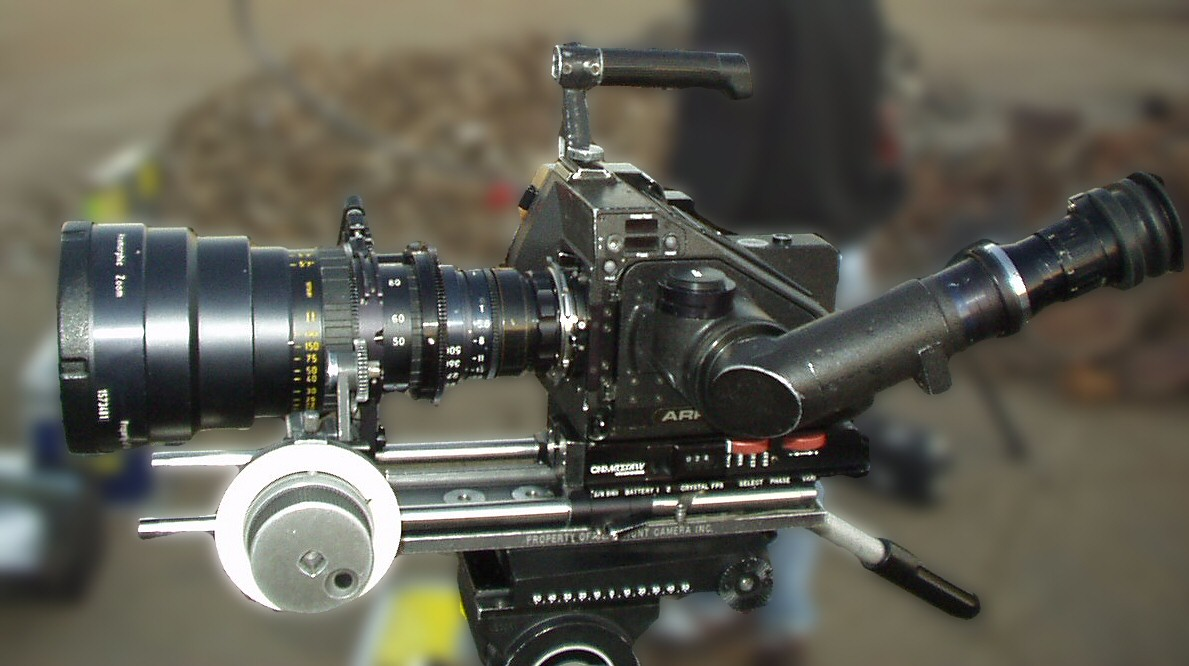
An Arri 35mm film camera with a follow focus mechanism mounted to a zoom lens.

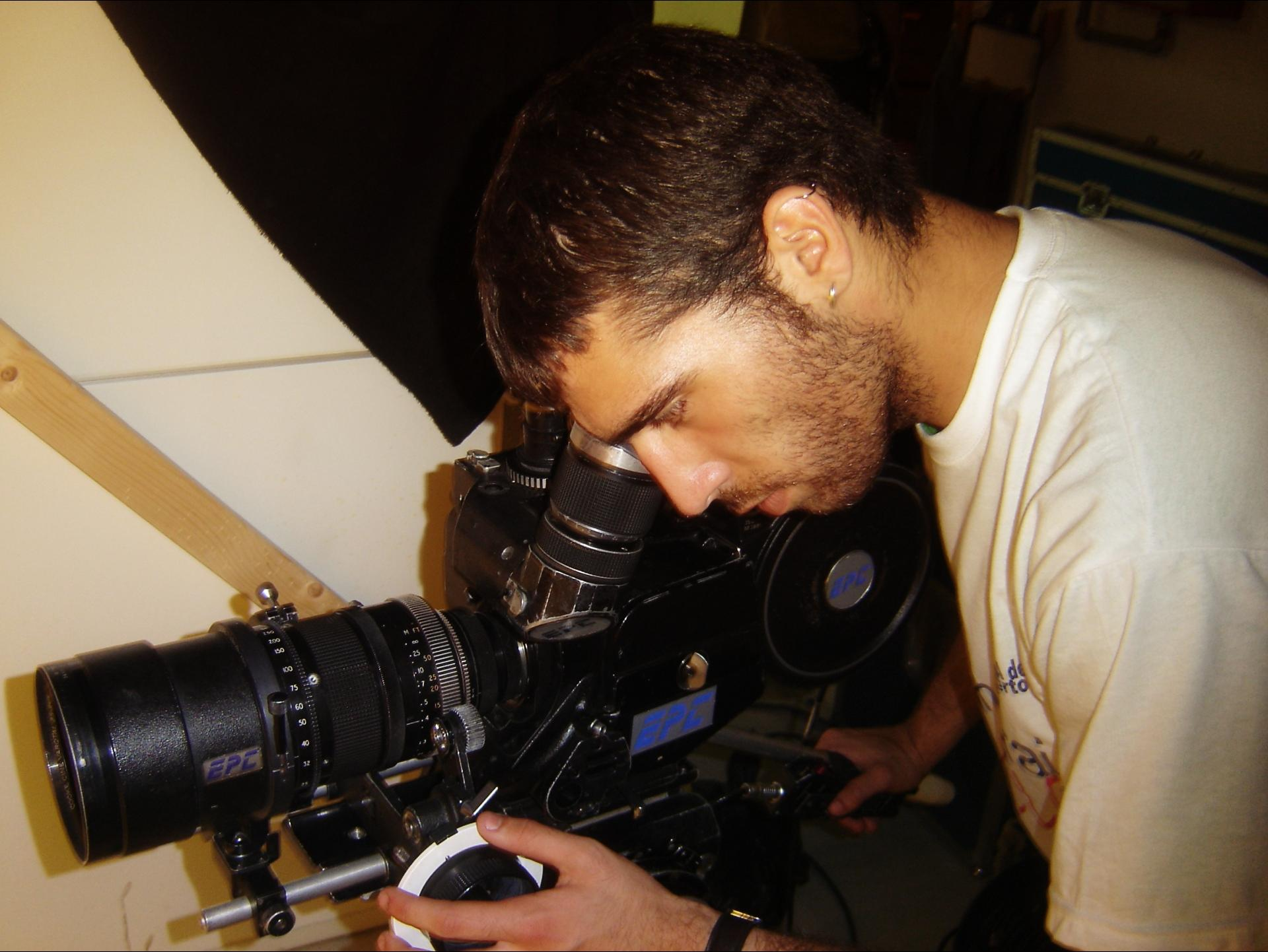
Pulling focus using a follow focus device

A follow focus is a focus control mechanism used in filmmaking with film cameras and in television production with professional video cameras. It helps the camera operator be more efficient and precise. It is usually operated by a focus puller (often called the 1st assistant camera, or 1st AC), but some camera operators prefer to pull their own focus (the act of changing focus is called "pulling" or racking focus).

== Overview ==
Manual focusing is usually a requisite for professional filmmaking, because autofocus systems may focus on undesired objects, or fail to adjust quickly enough to sudden changes. The job of the focus puller then is to adjust the focus onto different subjects as well as maintain focus during movement of the camera relative to the subject.

The mechanism works through a set of gears on the follow focus that are attached to teeth on the focus ring of the lens. These gears feed to a wheel that, when turned by a focus puller, spins the teeth and thus the ring on the lens. Practically, the device is not necessary as the operator can directly turn the ring on the lens. However, this would place the hand in an awkward position perpendicular to the camera rather than parallel, and turning beyond a certain distance (such as 360 degrees) would be impossible. Sometimes, such a "focus pull" would even be difficult with a follow focus, so an L-shaped metal rod called a speed crank can be attached in the provided square hole at the center of the wheel. Thus, the hand merely has to spin the rod, which turns the wheel. If it is necessary for the operator to stand a short distance from the camera, e.g., if the camera is inconveniently high, a short flexible cable called a "focus whip" can be used.

The stationary white disk surrounding the wheel is used by the focus puller to jot down marks, and take care of the focus according to the marks he/she took during rehearsals. A focus puller often uses a tape to correctly measure the distance from the lens to the subject, allowing for accurate marking of the disk.

Some autofocus lenses with a focus ring (such as those on most consumer and prosumer camcorders) are not "true" manual focus lenses—meaning that turning the ring does not directly adjust the elements inside the lens, but rather actuates the internal camera electronics that adjust the focus point. Such lenses are sometimes called "focus by wire," and the behavior then depends upon the software algorithm used by the lens. If the focusing algorithm only considers the distance the focusing ring is turned (called linear focus-by-wire), then the behavior of the lens is very similar to that of a manual-focus lens. However, certain implementations of such a system also consider the speed with which the ring was turned (called nonlinear focus-by-wire), which can make precise and repeatable focus pulls difficult, and use of a follow focus impractical.

== See also ==
- Racking focus
- Follow shot
- Whip zoom
