= Camera coverage =

Concept in film and video production

Camera coverage, or coverage, is the amount and kind of footage shot used to capture a scene in filmmaking and video production. The film editor uses coverage in post-production to assemble the final cut.

== Coverage in cinematography ==
The coverage technique involves shooting from more positions than will be used in the final film, allowing the director to choose shots during the editing process. This avoids the need to bring back cast and crew for later pickups and reshoots if the director is unsatisfied with the results from the camera positions that were originally planned. Even meticulously planned, storyboarded, and rehearsed films may find a need for coverage. Coverage also allows the editor to take control of a performance, adjusting the timing so that the audience's needs (rather than those of the director or actor) are met.

There are generally four types of cinematography:

- The master scene method: The scene is shot from beginning to end, usually but not always using a wide shot, to create the "master shot". In complex scenes, "mini-master shots" may be created instead. Coverage is then used to create other shots of the scene.
- Overlapping method: Also called the "triple-take method", the camera shoots initial action in the scene (usually a wide shot), and then the action is paused or repeated to allow a different camera angle and lighting set-up. This is similar to coverage, but without a master shot. Infrequently used, this type of cinematography is useful where an action cannot be repeated (such as when an item is destroyed at the end of the scene).
- In-One Method: Also called the "developing master", "oner", or (in French) plan-scene or plan-sequence, this is similar to the master scene method, but is planned and shot without the intention of using coverage.
- Freeform: Also called "documentary style", even when the story is fiction, the camera is hand-held and the image shows the shakiness of an unstabilized hand-held camera.

Coverage is part of the master scene method, and may be used in the freeform method.

The amount and kind of coverage is generally determined by the director in consultation with the cinematographer during the pre-production stage. Coverage provides the director and editor with the ability to change the pacing of the scene, to refocus the scene on different images, or even to use different takes. Coverage also allows the editor to get around mistakes in cinematography, the lack of clean frames, or continuity errors. More coverage is needed when filming explosions or stunts, as these are extremely difficult to replicate exactly. A single actor's performance which is particularly difficult, or a scene which has a large number of characters, will usually require more coverage than a two-person scene with simple dialogue.

In the Golden Age of Hollywood, a coherent style of acting, direction, editing, cinematography, theatrical realism, sound, and production design, collectively known as the "Hollywood style", dictated coverage. Directors and cinematographers were explicitly taught to capture a master shot, medium shots, close-ups, and cutaways from several different angles. This gave the director and editor, as well as producers and studio executives, the maximum amount of freedom in cutting the film. Since the demise of the studio system, coverage has taken on less importance in terms of crafting a scene due to the emphasis on the auteur theory of filmmaking. Veteran feature film editor John Rosenberg has argued, however, that moving away from the "Hollywood style" and studio system has led to lower-quality cinematography. In his opinion, coverage is too limited, takes end without clearing a frame, composition is poorly thought through, lighting is poor, and shots setting up the scene are sparse. (Note: According to David Mamet, the director's job is to break the script down into a list of shots. Directors tend to focus on shooting these shots, eliciting performances from their actors, and creating interesting visuals. Few directors are trained to shoot coverage.)

Editors use coverage to overcome problems with visualization and storytelling, using skills such as aesthetic sense, understanding of the technical aspects of filmmaking and experience in storytelling to determine where coverage is required.

In feature film production, coverage is delivered every day to the editor in the form of "dailies" (also known as "rushes"). These are all the shots from the prior day which the director saw fit to print. Not all coverage has to be used in the final cut.

=== Coverage in the master scene method ===
In the master scene method, the script and the master shot are the "road map" which the editor uses to craft the scene. The master shot is filmed first, since coverage must match what occurs in the master. Coverage consists of all the other shots—close-ups, medium shots, point-of-view shots, shot reverse shots, and others—required by the director to tell the story. All of these shots must obey the 180-degree rule. "Call" (the shot of the first actor, item, space) and "answer" (shots of the next actor, item, or space) shots use the same lens size and focus distance, so that things in the shot retain a consistent distance from the camera.

The director and editor generally understand that the master shot will be chopped into pieces and other shots inserted in order to create the final cut. Coverage also involves shooting enough extra film to allow the editor to find cutting points. At those points where the director intends to insert coverage, the dialogue or action needs to stop and the cinematographer needs to hold the shot for a second or two. This gives the editor the ability to choose where to end the scene. If the insert comes before the beginning of dialogue or action, the cinematographer should begin filming a second or two early (creating what is known as a "clean frame") for the editor to work with.

Coverage may also include the filming of transition shots to introduce or help exit a scene.

=== Coverage in the freeform method ===
In the freeform method, the cinematographer almost always keeps the camera focused on the individual who is speaking, or the primary action. Even if the scene is shot multiple times, this leaves almost no variation in each take.

When applied to the freeform method, coverage takes the form of a dialogue pass, reaction pass, and freeform pass. In the dialogue pass, the camera remains focused on whoever is talking or where the action is. In the reaction pass, the camera focuses only on the person listening or reacting to the speaker, or on those watching the action. In the freeform pass, the cinematographer chooses what to focus on: the speaker, the reactor, a wide shot, a close-up, or whatever seems appropriate. These three passes give the editor flexibility in building up the scene.

== Coverage shots ==
Coverage shots are needed because the long take master shot looks static to modern audiences.

The establishing shot is one kind of coverage shot. It helps to place the viewer in a physical context, and avoid a claustrophobic feel to the film.

Cutaway shots are considered part of coverage. These are images other than the principal action or dialogue. "A cutaway can be a reaction shot, what a character is seeing, a piece of the environment, or an object." Cutaway shots can be used when coverage is lacking, but they can also be integral elements of coverage designed to implement the visualization of the scene.

The cut-in/cut-out shot is another useful coverage shot. After the master shot is taken, a medium shot from the same angle is photographed. The editor can cut back and forth between the two shots. The cut-in or cut-out helps to cover the edit when dialogue is edited out ("compressed"), can be used by the director or editor to choose the best performance by an actor, and can even serve as a form of match cut that serves to place action in context.

While coverage is generally thought of in terms of shots and angles, coverage may also include the use of different focal lengths.

== Example ==
Editor Conrad Buff has discussed the use of coverage in a critical scene in the 2004 motion picture King Arthur. The scene involved a battle between two large armies on a frozen lake. During the battle, the ice breaks up and one of the armies falls into the frigid water. A lack of time and other issues left the director just two days to film what should have taken seven to ten production days. The first day was spent filming panorama shots of the approaching armies. The second day was spent filming the battle.

Buff discovered that although principal shots of the main actors had been filmed, little other coverage was included. Close-ups of the main actors, shots of ranks of archers firing arrows, volleys of arrows in flight, medium and close-up shots of men in battle, soldiers dying in battle, and even the ice breaking apart were missing. None of the shots in the dailies were in narrative order. Buff was able to piece together a rough cut using what limited coverage he had. Buff then indicated to the director shots that were missing, including close-ups, point-of-view shots and reaction shots.

The main unit was able to schedule time to film the close-ups and reaction shots against a greenscreen. The second unit filmed medium shots on a soundstage with a water tank, using extras and stunt performers to capture battle scene and ice break-up elements. The visual effects team then spent extra time and money transforming these shots into acceptable coverage.
