= Insert (filmmaking) =

Filmmaking technique

This sequence from It's a Wonderful Life (1946) uses two insert shots—one of a sign and one of a record player—to add visual detail to the actions performed by Donna Reed.

In film, an insert is a shot of part of a scene as filmed from a different angle and/or focal length from the master shot. Inserts cover action already covered in the master shot, but emphasize a different aspect of that action due to the different framing. An insert differs from a cutaway as cutaways cover action not covered in the master shot. Inserts are commonly used to direct the viewer's attention to a story-relevant detail, such as a clock, a letter, a newspaper headline, or an object being handled, that might be missed in a wider shot.

There are more exact terms to use when the new, inserted shot is another view of actors: close-up, head shot, knee shot, two shot. So the term "insert" is often confined to views of objects—and body parts, other than the head. Often inserts of this sort are done separately from the main action, by a second-unit director using stand-ins.

Inserts and cutaways can both be vexatious for directors, as care must be taken to preserve continuity by keeping the objects in the same relative position as in the main take, and having the lighting be the same.

== See also ==
- Continuity editing
- Cutaway (filmmaking)
