= Stalker vision =

Cinematic technique often used in horror movies

Stalker vision or monster vision is a cinema technique used to convey a sense of being watched. Often used in horror movies to inspire dread of what one is watching, this shot-framing incorporates a few techniques for effect.

A point-of-view shot is used to convey a clear sense of distance between the viewpoint and the subject. The subject is shown from the perspective of the stalker, and cover (such as foliage) is often shown in the periphery to demonstrate that the viewer is hiding.

Another aspect of stalker vision is that it usually shows an everyday action that is not usually public.

Also, one of the mainstays of stalker vision is that the victim is watched over a period of time. Often telescopes, binoculars, or other observation equipment are combined with a tree stand or some other place of watching.

Stalker vision often features a fairly helpless target, usually the female protagonist, or a child in a horror movie. This tendency of the stalker or monster to prey upon the weak is used to create hatred and dislike for the viewer, and worry for the victim.

== See also ==
- Thriller
- Monster movie
- Kubrick stare
