= Trunk shot =

Camera angle

A trunk shot in Reservoir Dogs

The trunk shot is a cinematic camera angle which is captures film from inside the trunk of a car. Though the trunk shot can be produced by placing the camera inside the trunk, the considerable bulk of a conventional movie camera and camera operator makes this difficult. Therefore, the shot is usually "cheated" by having the art department place a trunk door and some of the trunk frame close enough to the camera to make it appear to be shot from within a car. The trunk shot is a specialized type of low-angle shot.

== In film ==
This camera angle is often noted to be the trademark of filmmaker Quentin Tarantino. Although he did not invent it, Tarantino popularized the trunk shot, which is featured in Reservoir Dogs, Pulp Fiction, Jackie Brown, From Dusk Till Dawn, Kill Bill: Volume 1 and Inglourious Basterds. In Death Proof, Tarantino's traditional shot looking up at the actors from the trunk of a car is replaced by one looking up from under the hood.

The earliest trunk shot can be noted in the 1948 movie by Anthony Mann (though credited to Alfred L. Werker), He Walked by Night, when the police are inspecting the contents of a murder suspect's trunk. Another use of the shot is in 1967 film In Cold Blood (directed by Richard Brooks) after the two outlaws cross the borders to Mexico in a stolen car. In the thriller Spasmo, directed by Umberto Lenzi in 1974, this shot can be seen when the main character opens the trunk and a dead man appears. A trunk shot appears also in George Miller's 1985 movie Mad Max Beyond Thunderdome when Max, Master and the savage children are following Jedediah's son while escaping from their chasers guided by Entity. It is also used in the John Hughes film Uncle Buck (1989), wherein Buck (John Candy) opens his trunk to reveal a tied up teenager who cheated on Buck's niece. Don't Tell Mom the Babysitter's Dead has a trunk shot where the kids are discussing whether the babysitter's body will fit. The 1992 film Sneakers contains a trunk shot when Robert Redford's character is kidnapped. There is also a trunk shot used in A Good Day to Die Hard, when John McClane and his son Jack find a trunk full of guns and ammo in a car they are about to steal. Paul Thomas Anderson used the shot in his short film Cigarettes & Coffee (1993) and Jonathan Mostow in Breakdown (1997). In Pirates of the Caribbean: Dead Man's Chest (2006), there is a scene with a similar perspective, where Jack Sparrow, Elizabeth and Norrington find a buried chest and the camera looks up to them from inside the hole in the ground that the chest is in. This shot was also featured in a south Indian film named Aavesham (2024) in a song sequence which features the lead character’s birthday celebration.

== In television ==
In episode 11 of the first season of Parker Lewis Can't Lose, a series of trunk shots are used during the episode's intro. In the CW's Supernatural TV series, trunk shots can be seen looking up at the protagonists, Dean Winchester and Sam Winchester, in both the pilot episode and the second season's finale. In the Amazon Prime Video series The Boys, a trunk shot is used many times throughout the show. Both Supernatural and The Boys were developed by Eric Kripke. The trunk shot is also used several times in AMC's Breaking Bad. A trunk shot can be seen in the episode 18 Miles Out (episode 10) from the second season of The Walking Dead. On The Andy Griffith Show season 8 episode 18, "Emmett's Brother-In-Law", Andy, Howard, and Goober are seen looking under the hood of Emmett's brother-in-law's car. In the Netflix series The Umbrella Academy, season 1 episode 3, a trunk shot is seen when the two hitmen open the car to reveal Klaus in the trunk.

== In music videos ==
- In Colombian pop-singer Shakira's music video "Objection (Tango)", Shakira is shown from a trunk shot, smiling sadistically at her ex-boyfriend and his mistress, who are bound and gagged in the trunk of her car, which she then slams shut.
- In Axelle Red's 1998 music video "Rester Femme", Axelle is shown from a trunk shot looking at her husband, who is bound and gagged in the trunk of her car, which she then slams shut and blasts off.
- In Coolio's 1994 video "Fantastic Voyage," the singer and his crew drive a Chevy Impala lowrider to the beach, collecting partygoers along the way. After they arrive, a trunk shot is used as they open the trunk to let the party out.

== Other uses ==
The trunk shot was used in the 2002 video game Grand Theft Auto: Vice City, in a scene resembling the trunk shot scene of Tarantino's Pulp Fiction. In it, Tommy Vercetti and Lance Vance pull weaponry from a car's trunk before storming in on Ricardo Diaz's mansion.
