= Zooming (filmmaking) =

In filmmaking refers to the technique of changing the focal length of a zoom lens

In filmmaking and television production, zooming is the technique of changing the focal length of a zoom lens (and hence the angle of view) during a shot – this technique is also called a zoom. The technique allows a change from close-up to wide shot (or vice versa) during a shot, giving a cinematographic degree of freedom. But unlike changes in camera position, zooming does not change the perspective (the relative sizes of near and far objects); it only magnifies or reduces the size of the entire image as a whole.

Zooming can either be performed towards longer focal lengths, giving a "zoom in" effect: The filmed object will then increase in apparent size, and fewer objects become visible on film. Or it is performed towards shorter focal lengths, giving a "zoom out" effect: The filmed object will shrink in apparent size, and more objects come into view.

The speed of the zoom allows for a further degree of cinematographic freedom. Combined with a dolly camera move it is possible to create the dolly zoom effect.

Noticeable cinematographic examples for the use of slow zooms include the 1975 film Barry Lyndon by Stanley Kubrick, the 1979 film Stalker by Andrei Tarkovsky, and the 1994 film Sátántangó by Béla Tarr.

== See also ==
- Racking focus
- Follow focus
- Ken Burns effect
