= Follow shot =

Specific film camera angle

Follow shot (or moving shot) is a specific camera angle. The subject being filmed is seemingly pursued by the camera, for example by a Steadicam. The follow shot can be achieved through tracking devices, panning, the use of a crane, and zoom lenses resulting in different qualitative images but, nevertheless, recording a subject (performer) in motion.

== Usage ==
Follow shots are typically used in film to establish audience alignment with the perspective of the character being followed and to follow them. The audience is made aware of the character's presence and is able to observe them in action, while also being forced to identify with the character. It is considered neither first-person perspective nor third-person perspective.

== Examples ==
- Elephant: Each character is followed continuously during their narrative time.
- 2:37: Each character is followed several times, in a style similar to that of the previously mentioned Elephant.
- The Shining: The steadicam follows Danny as he rides his tricycle through the long hallways of the hotel.

== See also ==
- Kubrick stare
