= Shot/reverse shot =

Film technique showing two characters

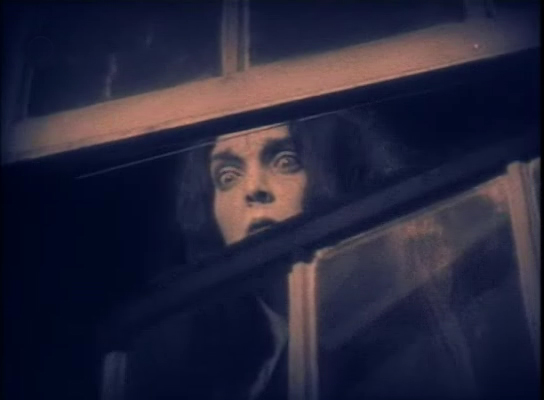
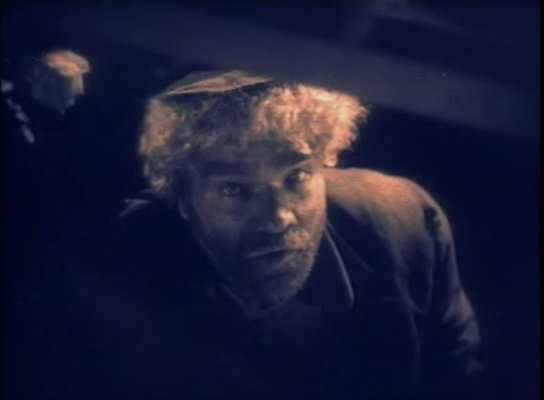
Shot/countershot in Greed (1924)

Shot/reverse shot (or shot/countershot) is a film technique where one character is shown looking at another character (often off-screen), and then the other character is shown looking back at the first character (a reverse shot or countershot). Since the actors are positioned as if facing each other, the viewer assumes that they are looking at each other.

== Context ==
Shot/reverse shot is a feature of the "classical" Hollywood style of continuity editing, which deemphasizes transitions between shots such that the spectator perceives one continuous action that develops linearly, chronologically, and logically. It is an example of an eyeline match.

== Sources ==
Bordwell, David; Thompson, Kristin (2006). Film Art: An Introduction. New York: McGraw-Hill. ISBN 0-07-331027-1.
