= Whip pan =

Type of camera movement used in films

A whip pan is a type of pan shot in which the camera pans so quickly that the picture blurs into indistinct streaks. It is commonly used as a transition between shots, and can indicate the passage of time or a frenetic pace of action. Much like the natural wipe, the whip pan, also known as the flash pan, offers a very convenient and visually interesting motivation to transition from one shot to another.

This technique is used liberally by directors Anatole Litvak, Sam Raimi, Damien Chazelle, James Wan, Wes Anderson and Edgar Wright. It is also frequently seen in 1970s martial arts movies. In Victor Lewis-Smith's satirical series TV Offal it was used frequently either as a means of transitioning between wildly different subjects, or as punctuation to a particularly scathing joke at someone's expense. Rod Serling employed it to introduce many episodes of The Twilight Zone after their cold opens, as a mechanism to reveal himself off to the side seemingly as part of the scene itself.

== See also ==
- Saccadic eye movement
