= Dolly zoom =

In-camera effect

Computer-generated representation of a dolly zoom

Frame from an animation showing a dolly zoom being performed. At the top of the image is the camera's view; the cubes stay the same size as the teapots in the background grow bigger. At the bottom of the image is a plan view showing the camera moving back while zooming in, illustrating how the effect is achieved.

In the video inset, the object moves with the camera and it does not zoom, so the FOV does not change; thus there is no dolly effect.

A dolly zoom (also known as a Hitchcock shot, Vertigo shot, Jaws effect, or zolly shot) is an in-camera effect that appears to undermine normal visual perception.

The effect is achieved by zooming a zoom lens to adjust the angle of view (often referred to as field of view, or FOV) while the camera dollies (moves) toward or away from the subject in such a way as to keep the subject the same size in the frame throughout. The zoom shifts from a wide-angle view into a more tightly packed angle. In its classic form, the camera angle is pulled away from a subject while the lens zooms in, or vice versa. The dolly zoom's switch in lenses can help audiences identify the visual difference between wide-angle lenses and telephoto lenses. Thus, during the zoom, there is a continuous perspective distortion, the most directly noticeable feature being that the background appears to change size relative to the subject. Hence, the dolly zoom effect can be broken down into three main components: the moving direction of the camera, the dolly speed, and the camera lens' focal length.

A dolly zoom can create a sensation of disorientation and discomfort, producing the impression that the film historian Dan Aulier described as a "peculiar visual effect where the subject of the shot maintains the same size in the frame while the background appears to stretch or compress."

== History ==
The effect was first created by Irmin Roberts, a Paramount second-unit cameraman, who devised the method for Alfred Hitchcock's film Vertigo. It is thought that Alfred Hitchcock specifically asked Roberts to assist him in creating a shot that exemplifies being in a drunk state after fainting at a party. At the time, Roberts had already designed a special camera capable of fast focal lens changes that allowed short-range projections. His expertise in focal lenses most likely prompted his innovation of the dolly zoom, which was more popularly recognized as the "trombone shot" or "contra zoom". Despite this step forward for cinematography, Roberts was not properly credited at the end of Vertigo. This shot has since been used in many other films, including Goodfellas, Jaws, and the Lord of the Rings films. Rainer Werner Fassbinder uses the effect twice in one shot in Chinese Roulette (1976).

=== Uses ===
Among the many creative uses the dolly zoom can provide to cinematographers, the shot can be divided into two types: the dolly-in/zoom-out and the dolly-out/zoom-in. The dolly-in/zoom-out shot is usually centered on a subject, where the background is pushed away from the character to create a profuse amount of uneasiness. For example, Poltergeist's famous dolly zoom stretches the background to make it seem as if the door is much farther away from the character than it actually is. In contrast, the dolly-out/zoom-in shot shrinks the background to seem much closer than it really is.

The dolly zoom is commonly used by filmmakers to represent the sensation of vertigo, a "falling-away-from-oneself feeling" or a feeling of unreality, or to suggest that a character is undergoing a realization that causes them to reassess everything they had previously believed. In general, the dolly zoom's amplification of emotion is a special effect that complements a director's arsenal of creativity. For example, in Sam Raimi's The Quick and the Dead, a dolly zoom, coupled with a Dutch angle shot, exemplifies drama between an intense shootout. An uneasy feeling of suspense can also be signified through a dolly zoom, most notably used in the movie Split in 2016, where Casey Cooke peers off into the distance in unwanted curiosity. Other uses include demonstrating overwhelming fear or important epiphanies for a character. The dolly zoom can also be utilized for the purposes of tonal shifts within the film. Directors may also decide to use the dolly zoom as an alternative to the generic wide shot in order to give sufficient exposition on the upcoming scene.

The technique does not necessarily need to be used for aesthetic or narrative reasons; it can serve as a way to seamlessly transition between two focal lengths to take advantage of the different perspective distortion of each angle of view. In the 12th episode of the first season of The Sopranos, a dolly zoom is used during a twenty-second shot that displays the character Mikey Palmice talking to two hitmen on a street corner at its start and ends with the camera looking into the interior of a car to capture his discussion with his boss Junior Soprano, who is parked close by. The shot follows Mikey's short walk between the two settings, and the camera pans to the side and tracks backwards away from Junior's car, causing the background to "grow" in size as the cinematographer zooms the lens in and the camera moves backwards. Here, the effect is used to avoid a compromise that would otherwise be necessary: a longer focal length throughout the shot would show less of the surrounding streetscape, and a wider one would introduce distortion that would make Mikey appear smaller than Junior. The technique allows the cinematographers to achieve the framing and perspective they want at both ends of an extended take without needing to introduce an additional cut into the scene or disturbing the viewer's immersion by making the movements of the camera more apparent.

=== Notable examples ===
Jaws (1975) uses a dolly zoom to focus on Martin Brody's realization that there is a shark on the beach.

In Raging Bull (1980), Martin Scorsese uses dolly zoom shot to disorient the audience and put them in Jake LaMotta's shoes, and thus creating a vertigo effect.

In Goodfellas (1990), Scorsese uses dolly zooms to convey tensions between characters. This shot is most famously employed in Henry's dive into paranoia, where he eats at a diner with Jimmy while tracking a window to see if anybody has been following him.

In The Lion King (1994), Simba is dolly zoomed looking terrified after he watches from afar a stampede of wildebeests running down from a hill.

The Lord of the Rings: The Fellowship of the Ring (2001) contains a rare example of a dolly zoom with an empty foreground, which makes the distortion in the shot more obvious to emphasize Frodo’s utter terror when he senses an enemy approaching for the first time.

In Shaun of the Dead (2004), a dolly zoom places comedic emphasis on Shaun's bravery, which ultimately fails when his shotgun jams.

In Ratatouille (2007), Anton Ego has a flashback to his childhood, signified through a dolly zoom, after eating Remy's ratatouille. Throughout the film, dolly zooms are used extensively to highlight the bonding between two characters, such as when Remy feels a personal connection with Chef Gusteau on television.

In the Breaking Bad episode "Ozymandias", a subtle dolly zoom is used in Walter White's reaction shot over the murder of his brother-in-law, Hank Schrader.

In Guardians of the Galaxy Vol. 2 (2017), a dolly zoom is used to emphasize the shock Peter Quill experiences when his father, Ego, tells him that he killed Quill's mother Meredith.

In Severance, dolly zooms are used to represent an employee transitioning between their "Innie" company personas at work and their "Outie" real-world selves.

== Optics ==
For most purposes, it can be assumed that the image space and the object space are in the same medium. Thus, for an object in focus, the distance between the lens and image plane $s_\text{i}$, the distance between lens and the object $s_\text{o}$, and the focal length $f$ are related by

$${1 \over s_i} + {1 \over s_o} = {1 \over f}.$$

Then the transverse magnification is

$$M = {s_\text{i} \over s_\text{o}} = {f \over (s_\text{o} - f)}.$$

The axial magnification $M_\text{ax}$ of an object at $s_\text{o}$ is the rate of change of the lens–image distance $s_\text{i}$ as the lens–object distance $s_\text{o}$ changes. For an object of finite depth, one can conceive of the average axial magnification as the ratio of the depth of the image and the depth of the object:

$$M_\text{ax} = \left| {d \over d(s_\text{o})} {s_\text{i} \over s_\text{o}} \right| = \left| {d \over d(s_\text{o})} {f \over (s_\text{o} - f)} \right| = \left| {-f \over (s_\text{o} - f)^2} \right| = {M^2 \over f}.$$

One can see that if magnification remains constant, a longer focal length results in a smaller axial magnification, and a smaller focal length in a larger axial magnification. That is, when using a longer focal length while moving the camera/lens away from the object to maintain the same magnification M, objects seem shallower, and the axial distances between objects seem shorter. The opposite—increased axial magnification—happens with shorter focal lengths while moving the camera/lens towards the object.

=== Calculating distances ===
To achieve the effect, the camera needs to be positioned at a certain distance from the object that is supposed to remain still during the dolly zoom. The distance depends on how wide the scene is to be filmed and on the field of view (FOV) of the camera lens. Before calculating the distances needed at the different fields of view, the constant width of the scene has to be calculated:

$$\text{distance} = \frac{\text{width}}{2\tan\left(\frac{1}{2}\text{FOV}\right)}.$$

For example, a FOV of 90° and a distance of 2 meters yield a constant width of 4 meters, allowing a 4-meter-wide object to remain still inside the frame during the effect.
