= Whip zoom =

Cinematography technique

Example clip of a whip zoom effect being used with an edit

A whip zoom (also referred to as a snap zoom or crash zoom) is a type of camera shot in which the camera zooms in or out quickly, allowing the viewer to focus on the subject. Another use of the whip zoom is to enable the shot to be edited as a cut from a long shot to a close up, or vice versa.

This technique is used by several directors such as Quentin Tarantino, Martin Scorsese, Kevin Smith and Rainer Werner Fassbinder. Examples can be seen in 1970s kung fu film and in the movies Kill Bill: Volume 2, Goodfellas, Tusk, Kundo: Age of the Rampant, Man of Steel and Eight Hours Don't Make a Day. Horror genre examples can be found in The Shining and The Exorcist III.
