= Kubrick stare =

Technique in film

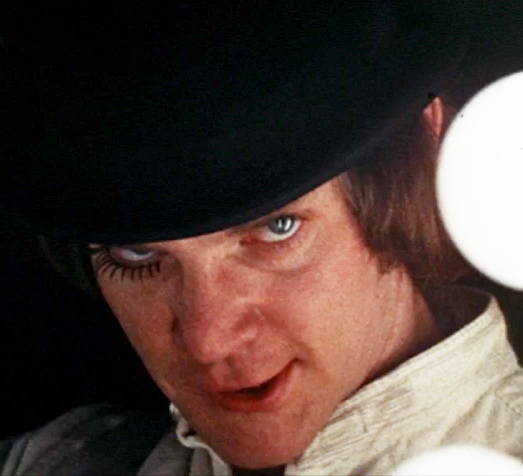
Malcolm McDowell (in character as Alex) performing a Kubrick stare in A Clockwork Orange. The Telegraph describes the Kubrick stare as "[making the onlooker party] to the subject’s bubbling derangement".

The Kubrick stare is a technique used to portray insane or unstable characters in film. In a Kubrick stare, an actor looks out from under the brow line and tilts their head towards the camera. Deemed "one of cinema's most recognizable shots" by film critic Robbie Collin, the technique is named after Stanley Kubrick, who often used it, but it has also been used by other directors before and since. The term was coined by cinematographer Douglas Milsome to describe one of Alex's facial expressions in the Kubrick film A Clockwork Orange (1971).

Film critics have noted the Kubrick stare for its ability to break the fourth wall and to evoke fear. Collin has written about how some actors are more suited to perform the Kubrick stare because of their facial structures.

== Description and usage ==
A Kubrick stare involves an actor looking out from under the brow line and tilting their head towards the camera. Sometimes, the actor will smile in a sinister fashion. It is often used to convey that a character has become dangerously mentally unstable. Thus, the stare has been described as looking creepy. It has been described by The Telegraph as "one of cinema's most recognizable shots".

The origin of the term lies in the making of director Stanley Kubrick's A Clockwork Orange (1971). According to actor Malcolm McDowell, whilst filming the movie, Kubrick requested that McDowell react to hearing music by Beethoven for a scene. After several tries, they agreed upon an expression. McDowell spoke about the experience in 2014:

So [Kubrick] said, "I'm going to play the Beethoven Choral Symphony real loud. See what happens." So I was doing various things, like—don't forget I'm also supposed to be a little high. And so kind of this look came, and he suddenly started to laugh. And he was laughing because the eyes were kind of up and glazed over and the mouth kind of took on a weird look. And when he started to laugh, we knew we had it. We knew that that's what it was going to be. Because we were making a comedy, let's face it. And all I had to do was repeat it for that beginning shot.

Director of photography Douglas Milsome dubbed it the "Kubrick stare", coining the term. Kubrick found McDowell's gaze compelling enough to put on the poster for A Clockwork Orange. Kubrick went on to extensively use the technique that bore his name in almost all his films, most notably in Full Metal Jacket (1987) and The Shining (1980).

Other directors and actors have relied on the technique to convey derangement. Anthony Perkins (as Norman Bates) does this in Hitchcock's Psycho (1960), which predates A Clockwork Orange. It can be seen in The Silence of the Lambs (1991), Donnie Darko (2001), and Batman (1989).

The supervillain the Joker has become associated with trope via actor Heath Ledger's use of it when playing the character in The Dark Knight (2008).

In the horror film Smile (2022), the protagonist is haunted by a many-faced entity, which reveals itself to its victims donning the stare. In the sequel, Smile 2 (2024), Ray Nicholson performs the stare in emulation of his father Jack Nicholson in The Shining.

== Reception and analysis ==
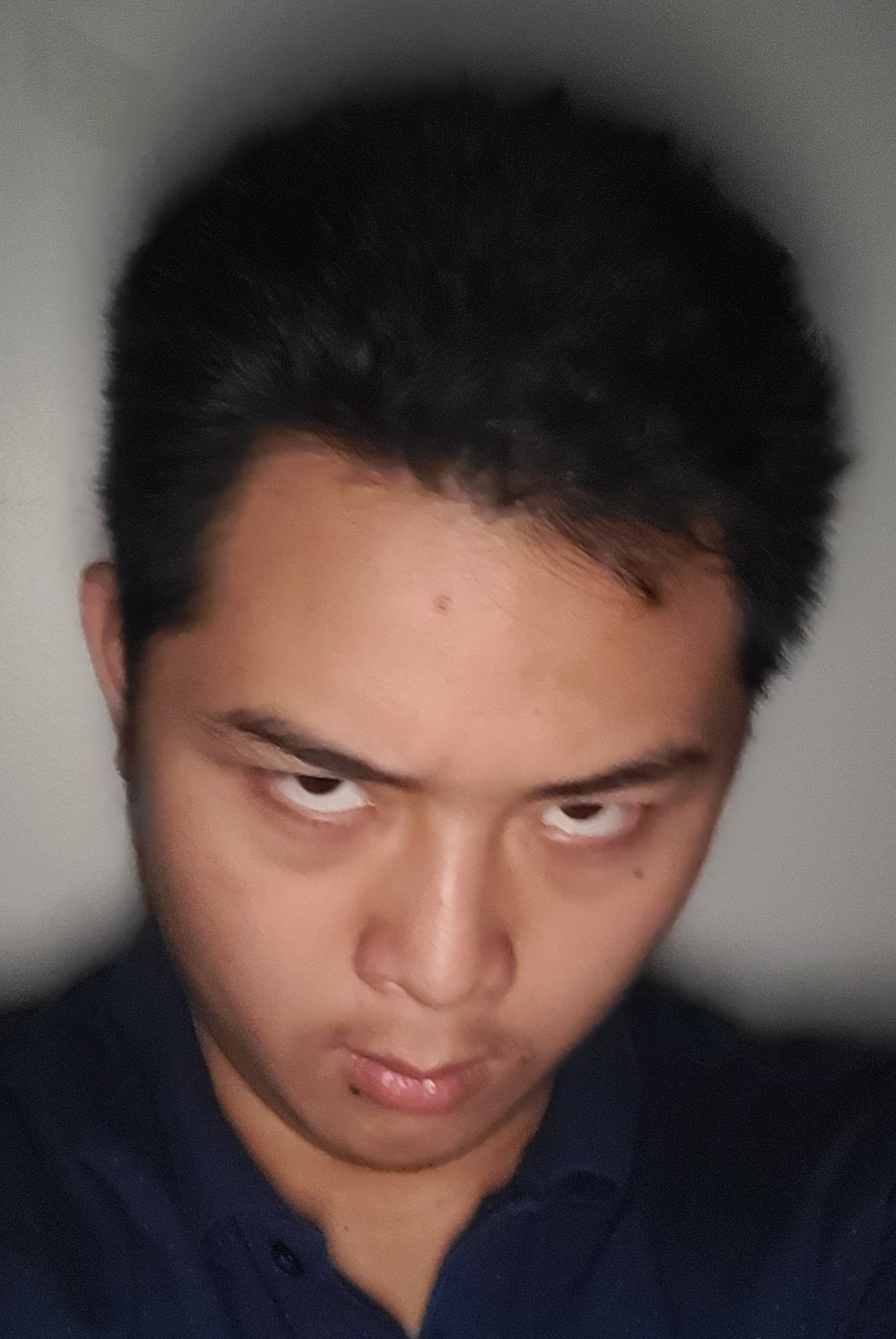
A successful Kubrick stare can be "invasive".

Amy Nolan, an associate professor of English at Wartburg College, wrote that the stare often acts as silent communication between characters, especially when the one staring has crossed "from sanity to insanity [with] an already-fragile ego".

Researcher Matthew Melia notes that an actor performing the stare will give the impression that they are looking past the fourth wall and directly at the audience. He describes the technique as "invasive" and "troubling". Slate remarks that the facial expression is perhaps unrivalled in evoking fear in cinema. Similarly, The Telegraph describes the stare as reveling in the viewer's unease.

In analyzing Private Pyle's Kubrick stare from Full Metal Jacket, Jens Kjelgaard-Christiansen, who studies communication and culture, notes that the character's lowered eyebrows and smiling mouth seem to contradict one another, indicating both anger and joy at the same time. He adds that abnormal gazes can come across as creepy, as humans read emotions from the eyes.

Robbie Collin, writing in The Daily Telegraph, opines that only actors with an innate "coiled menace" in their facial structures are able to perform a Kubrick stare well, regardless of acting ability. He comments that Jack Nicholson appears to constantly look as if he were giving a Kubrick stare, due to the "hunch of his eyebrows and curl of his lip". Manohla Dargis, reviewing Furiosa: A Mad Max Saga (2024), comments that Anya Taylor-Joy is suited to perform a Kubrick stare as she has large eyes, whose whites are accentuated when she looks up.

Reviewing A Clockwork Orange, film critic Roger Ebert opines that filming the amoral character Alex from above makes him look "messianic" instead of villainous. In a review of Full Metal Jacket, Ebert criticizes Kubrick for using the technique, stating that it, "promises exactly what happens and spoils some of the suspense."
