= American shot =

Cinematic technique

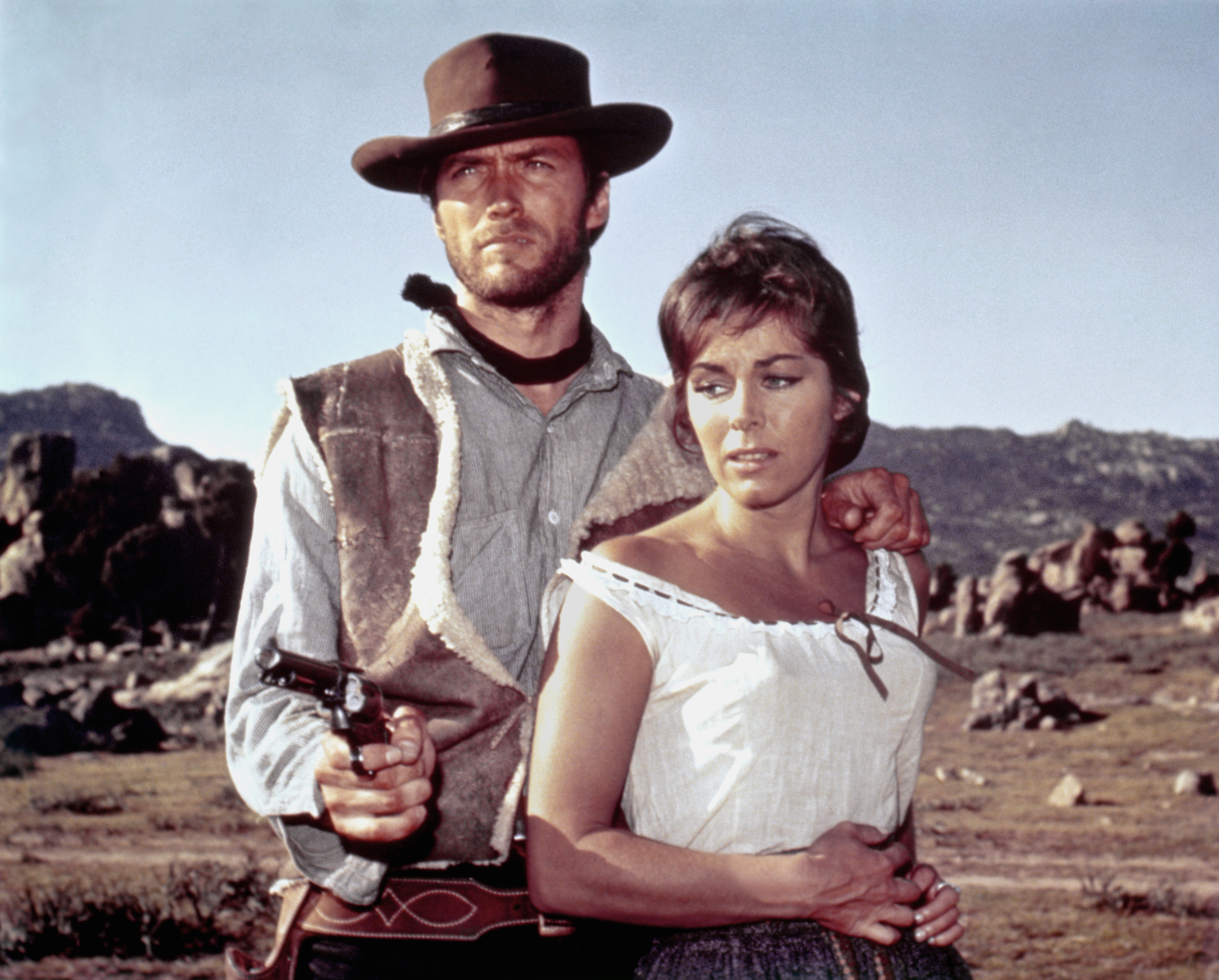
An example of a "cowboy shot" in A Fistful of Dollars

An American shot or cowboy shot is a medium-long ("knee") film shot of a group of characters, who are arranged so that all are visible to the camera. It is a translation of a phrase from French film criticism, plan américain. The usual arrangement is for the actors to stand in an irregular line from one side of the screen to the other, with the actors at the end coming forward a little and standing more in profile than the others. The purpose of the composition is to allow complex dialogue scenes to be played out without changes in camera position. In some literature, this is simply referred to as a 3/4 shot.

One of the other main reasons why French critics called it "American shot" was its frequent use in the western genre. This was because a shot that started at knee level would reveal the weapon of a cowboy, usually holstered at his waist. It is the closest the camera can get to an actor while keeping both their face and their holstered gun in frame.

The French critics thought it was characteristic of American films of the 1930s or 1940s; however, it was mostly characteristic of cheaper American movies, such as Charlie Chan mysteries where people collected in front of a fireplace or at the foot of the stairs in order to explain what happened a few minutes ago.

Howard Hawks legitimized this style in his films, allowing characters to act, even when not talking, when most of the audience would not be paying attention. It became his trademark style.
