= Dutch angle =

Type of camera shot

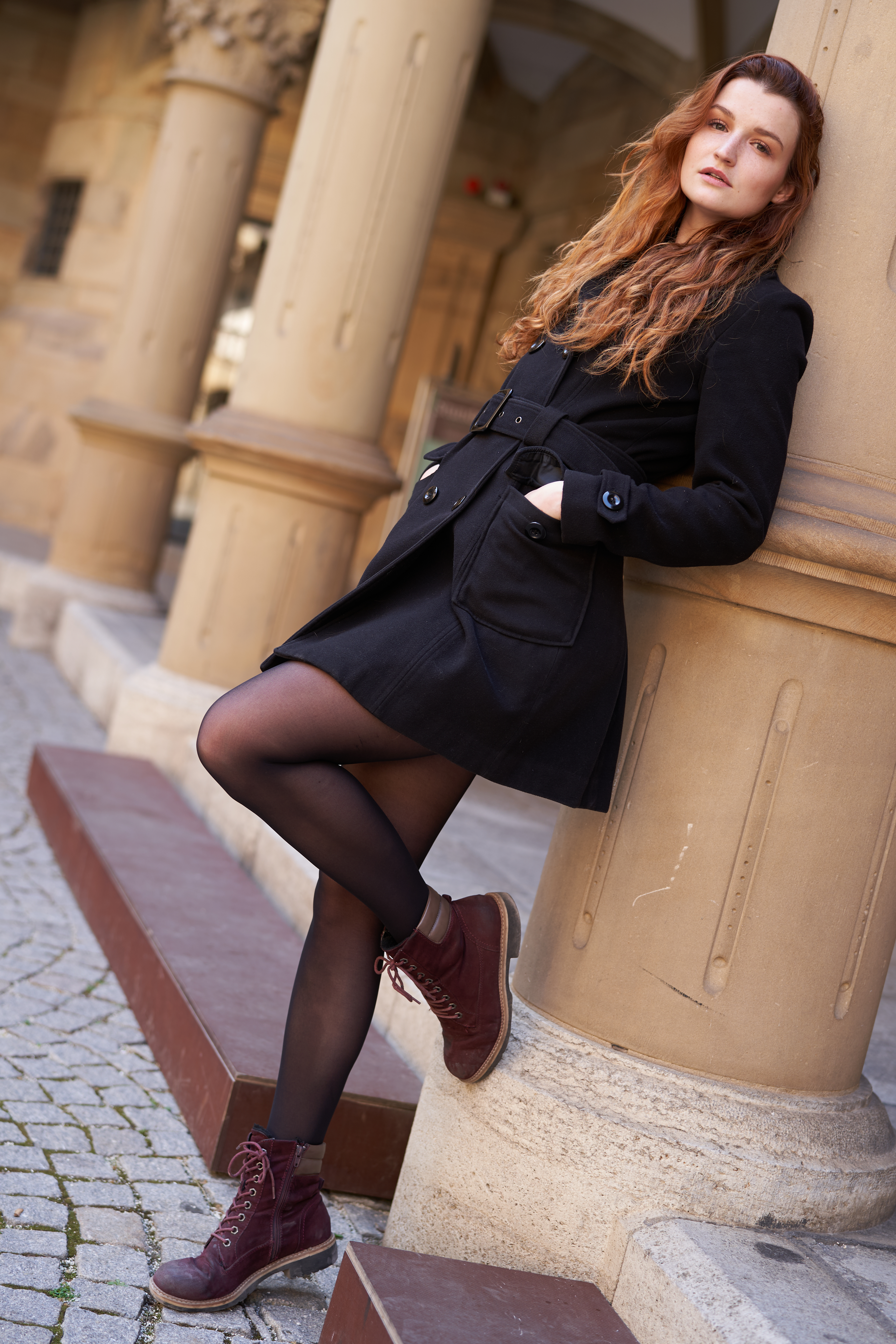
Intentional camera tilt or Dutch angle – example in fashion photography for filling the frame

In filmmaking and photography, the Dutch angle, also known as Dutch tilt, canted angle, vortex plane, oblique angle, or a Durkin, is a type of camera shot that involves setting the camera at an angle so that the shot is composed with vertical lines at an angle to the side of the frame, or so that the horizon line of the shot is not parallel with the bottom of the frame. This produces a viewpoint akin to tilting one's head to the side. In cinematography, the Dutch angle is one of many cinematic techniques often used to portray psychological uneasiness or tension in the subject being filmed. The Dutch angle is strongly associated with German expressionist cinema, which employed it extensively.

== Etymology ==
The "Dutch" in "Dutch angle" is held by some to be a corruption of the German word Deutsch (meaning "German") due to the supposed popularity of the shot in silent-era German films. Alternatively, the adjective "Dutch" is thought to indicate something out of the ordinary (compare Dutch uncle, Dutch treat or Dutch auction) or, as in this case and the similarly named Dutch roll in aeronautics, something which is out of line.

== Method ==
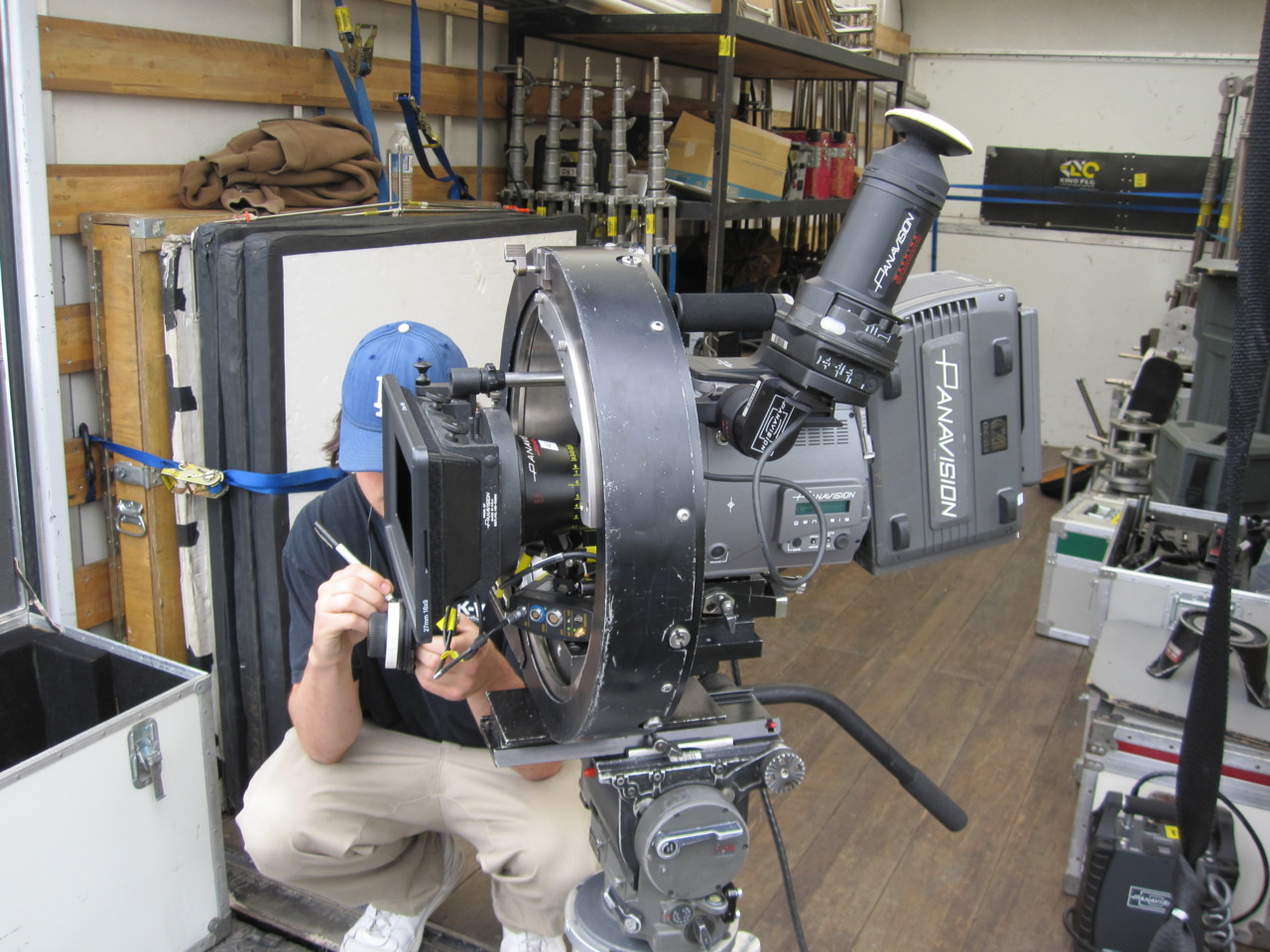
A special axis head allows for cinematographers to set up Dutch angles.

The Dutch angle is a shot in which the camera has been rotated around the axis of the lens and relative to the horizon or vertical lines in the shot.

The primary use of a Dutch angle is to cause a sense of unease or disorientation for the viewer. Dutch angles are often static shots, but in a dynamic (moving) Dutch angle shot, the camera can pivot, pan, or track along the established diagonal axis for the shot.

== History ==
The earliest recorded occurrences of the camera technique is to be found in the Edwin S. Porter American film Dream of a Rarebit Fiend (1906), itself based on Winsor McCay's comic strip of the same name, already known for its use of surrealist and oblique angles in its drawings.

The angle was widely used to depict madness, unrest, exoticism, and disorientation in German expressionist films, leading to one possible theory of its name "Dutch" (Deutsch). Montages of Dutch angles are often structured such that the tilts are horizontally opposed in each shot – for example, a right-tilted shot will be followed with a left-tilted shot, and so on.

Russian film director Dziga Vertov's 1929 experimental documentary Man with a Movie Camera contains uses of the Dutch angle, among other innovative techniques pioneered by Vertov.

In Hollywood's classic age, one filmmaker who used Dutch angles often was Alfred Hitchcock, whose early career included time at UFA studios in Germany; examples include Suspicion (1941), Notorious (1946), Strangers on a Train (1951) and The Man Who Knew Too Much (1956).

The 1949 film The Third Man makes extensive use of Dutch angle shots, to emphasize the main character's alienation in a foreign environment. Director Carol Reed has said that William Wyler gave him a spirit level after seeing the film, to sardonically encourage him to use more traditional shooting angles.

Dutch angles were used extensively in the 1960s Batman TV series and its 1966 film spin-off; each villain had their own angle, as they were "crooked".

The 1995 movie Casino uses the Dutch angle to create a sense of unease and growing chaos when Nicky Santoro and Ace Rothstein's wife Ginger are having an affair in a hotel. The scene begins with Ginger agreeing to "back off" Santoro, and the opening shot of the hotel is at a regular angle, then hits the Dutch angle to help underscore the chaos that this affair will have in everyone's lives.

Dutch angles are frequently used by film directors who have a background in the visual arts, such as Tim Burton (in Edward Scissorhands and Ed Wood), and Terry Gilliam (in Brazil, The Fisher King, 12 Monkeys, Fear and Loathing in Las Vegas and Tideland) to represent madness, disorientation, or drug psychosis. In his Evil Dead trilogy, Sam Raimi used Dutch angles to show that a character had become possessed by evil. In Rainer Werner Fassbinder’s Die Sehnsucht der Veronika Voss (1982), a Dutch angle is used to convey the odd tension that strangers are exerting on the main character.

Tom Hooper frequently uses Dutch angles in his work in more creative ways and to reflect the time periods and settings of the stories, as seen in his work on Les Misérables (2012) and The King's Speech (2010). In the 2008 miniseries John Adams, Hooper uses Dutch tilts to contrast the American scenes with the more traditional-looking cinematography of the scenes in France.

Power Rangers used Dutch angles frequently under former stunt coordinator and executive producer Koichi Sakamoto.

The Dutch angle is an overt cinematographical technique that can be overused. The science-fiction film Battlefield Earth (2000), in particular, drew sharp criticism for its pervasive use of the Dutch angle. In the words of film critic Roger Ebert: "the director, Roger Christian, has learned from better films that directors sometimes tilt their cameras, but he has not learned why".

Dutch angles are often used in horror video games, particularly those with static camera angles such as early entries in the Resident Evil and Silent Hill franchises. Similar to their use in movies, these angles are used to bring about a feeling of unease in the player.

The Dutch angle is sometimes used in documentary films for graphs to make a trend in plotted data appear less extreme and mislead the viewer

== Examples ==
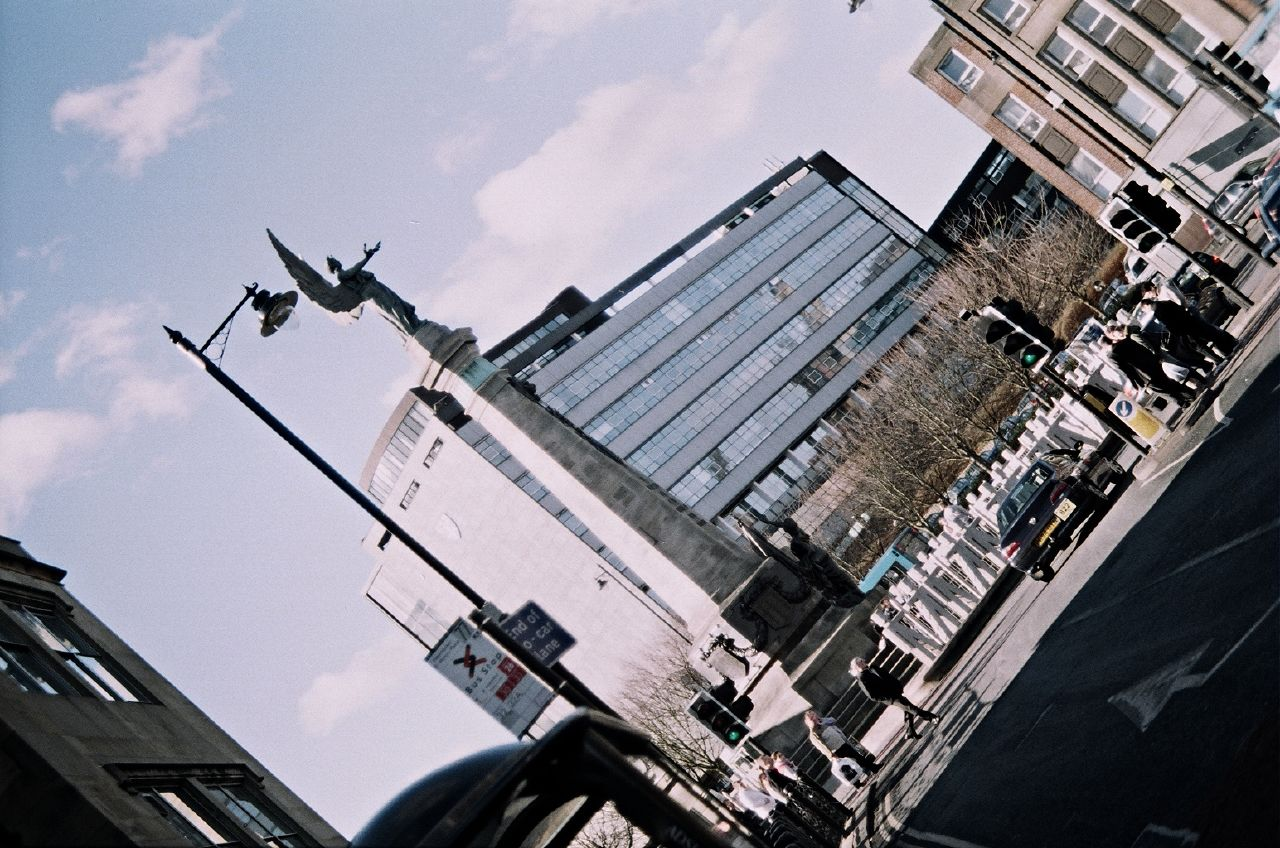

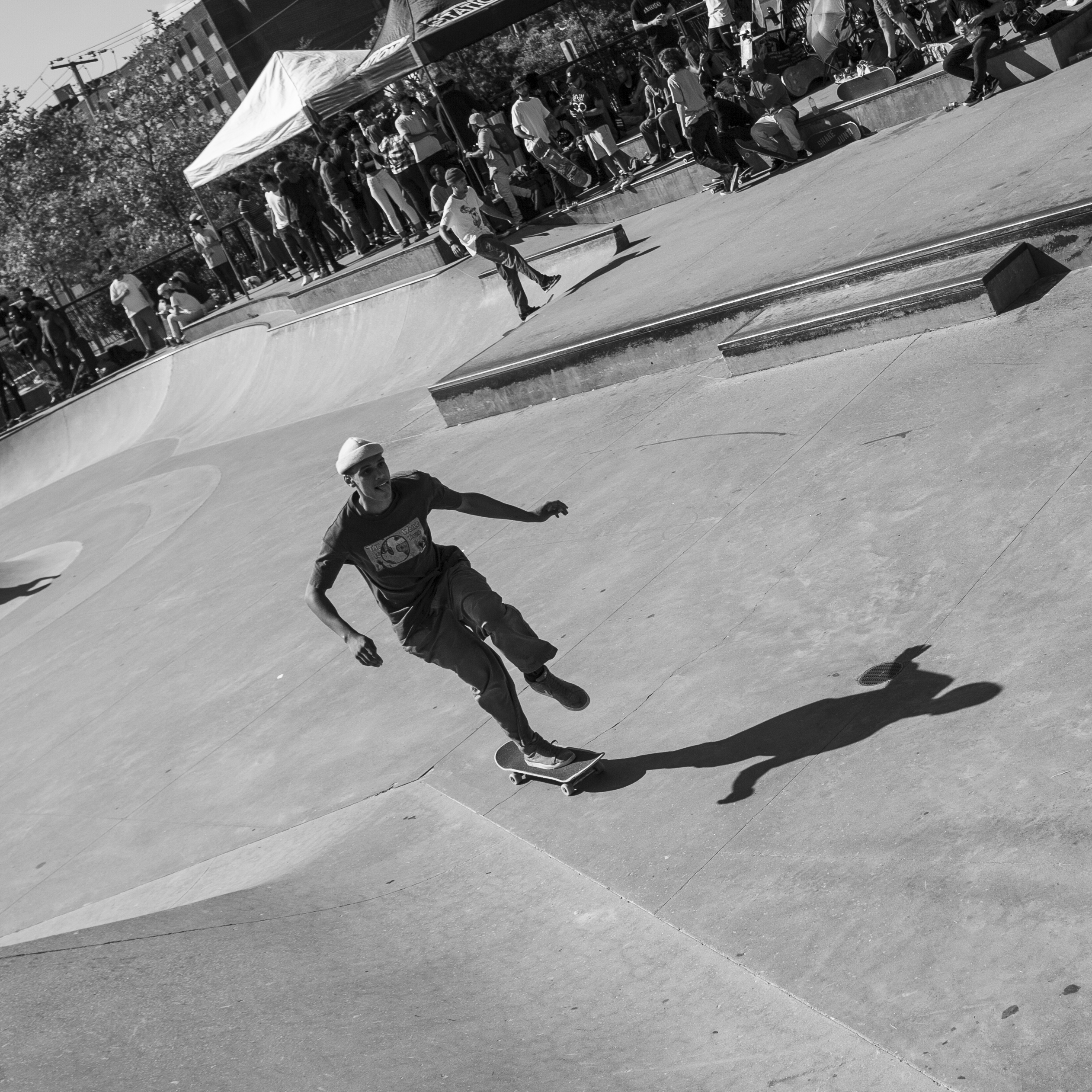

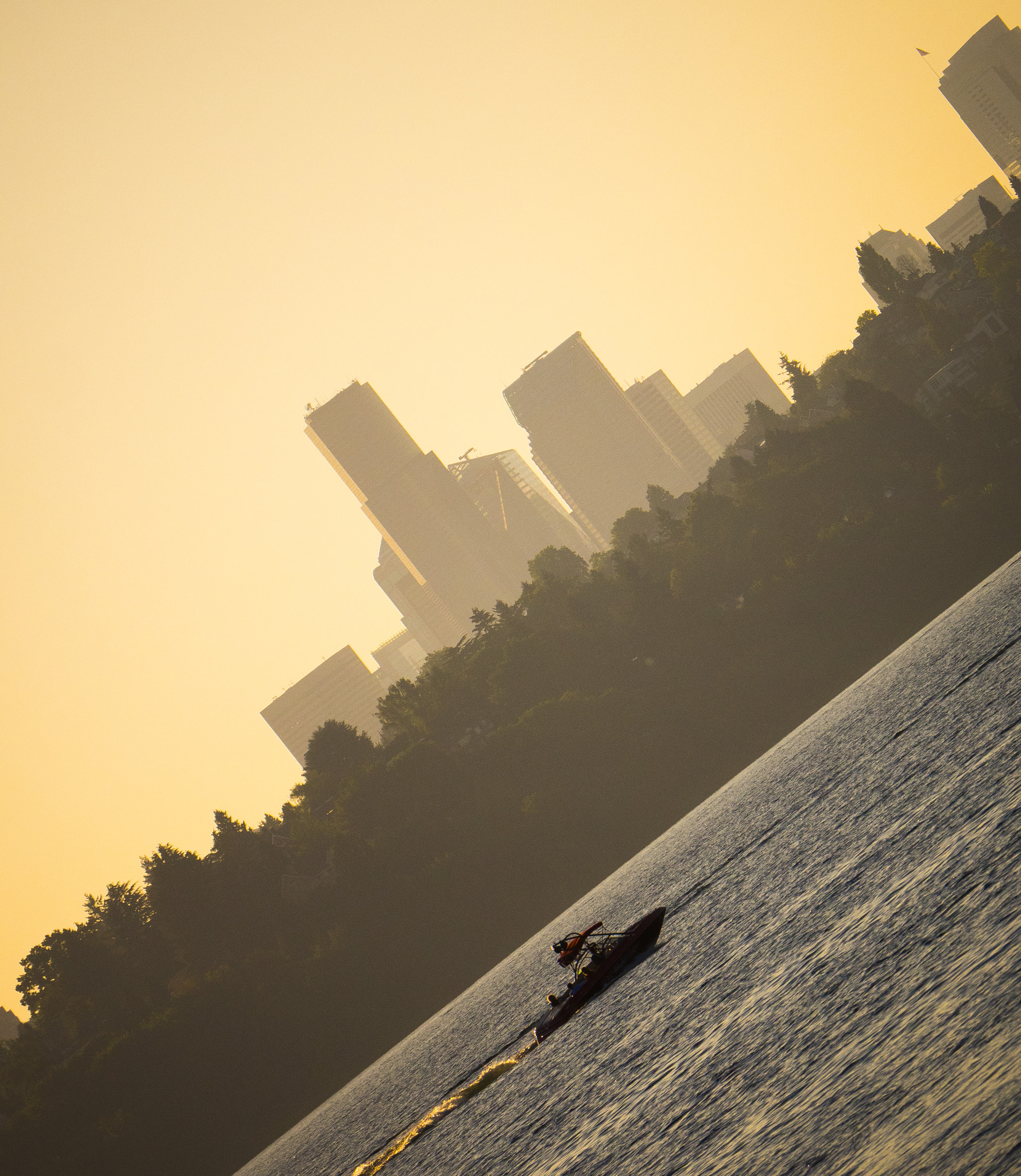

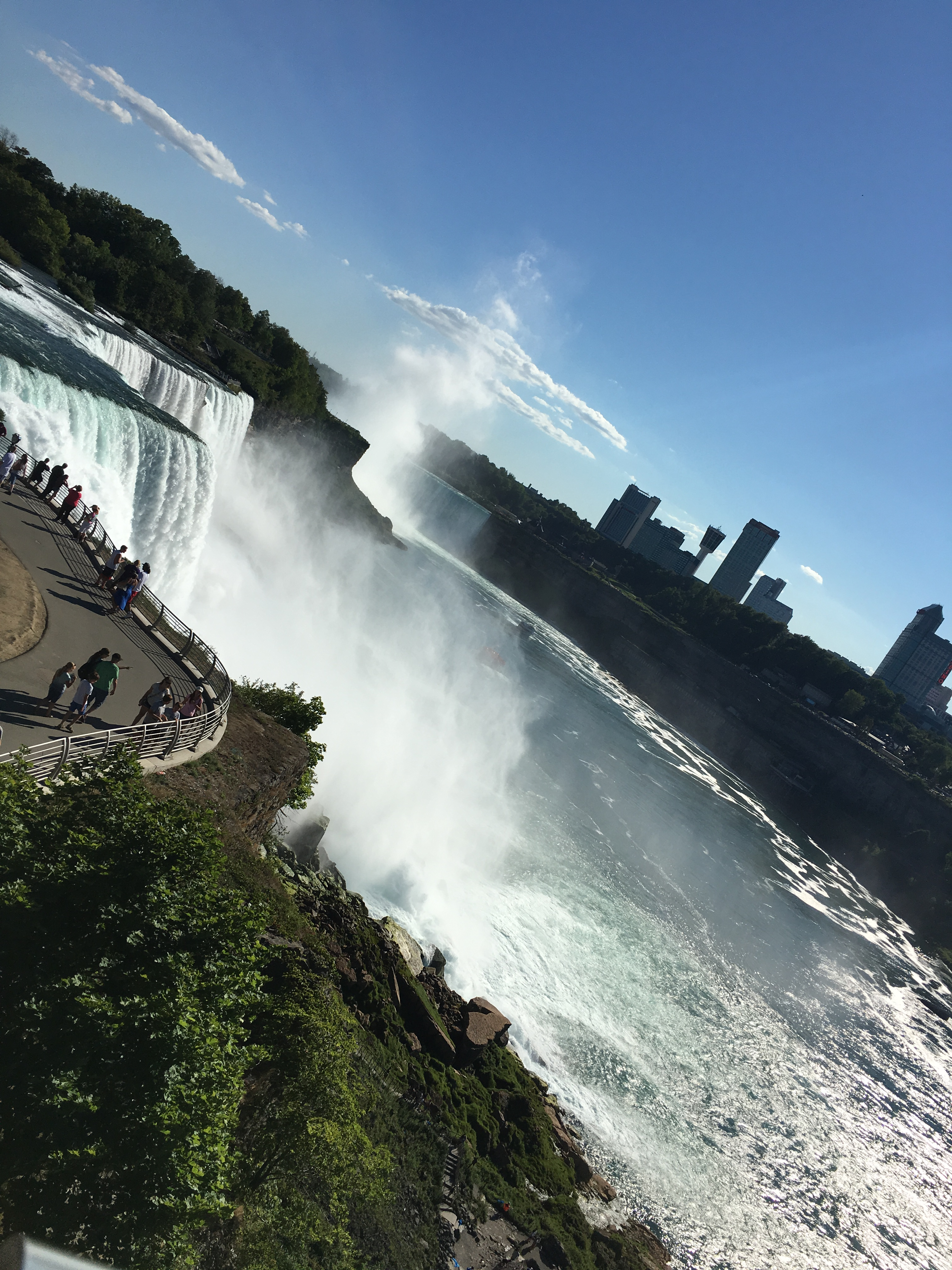

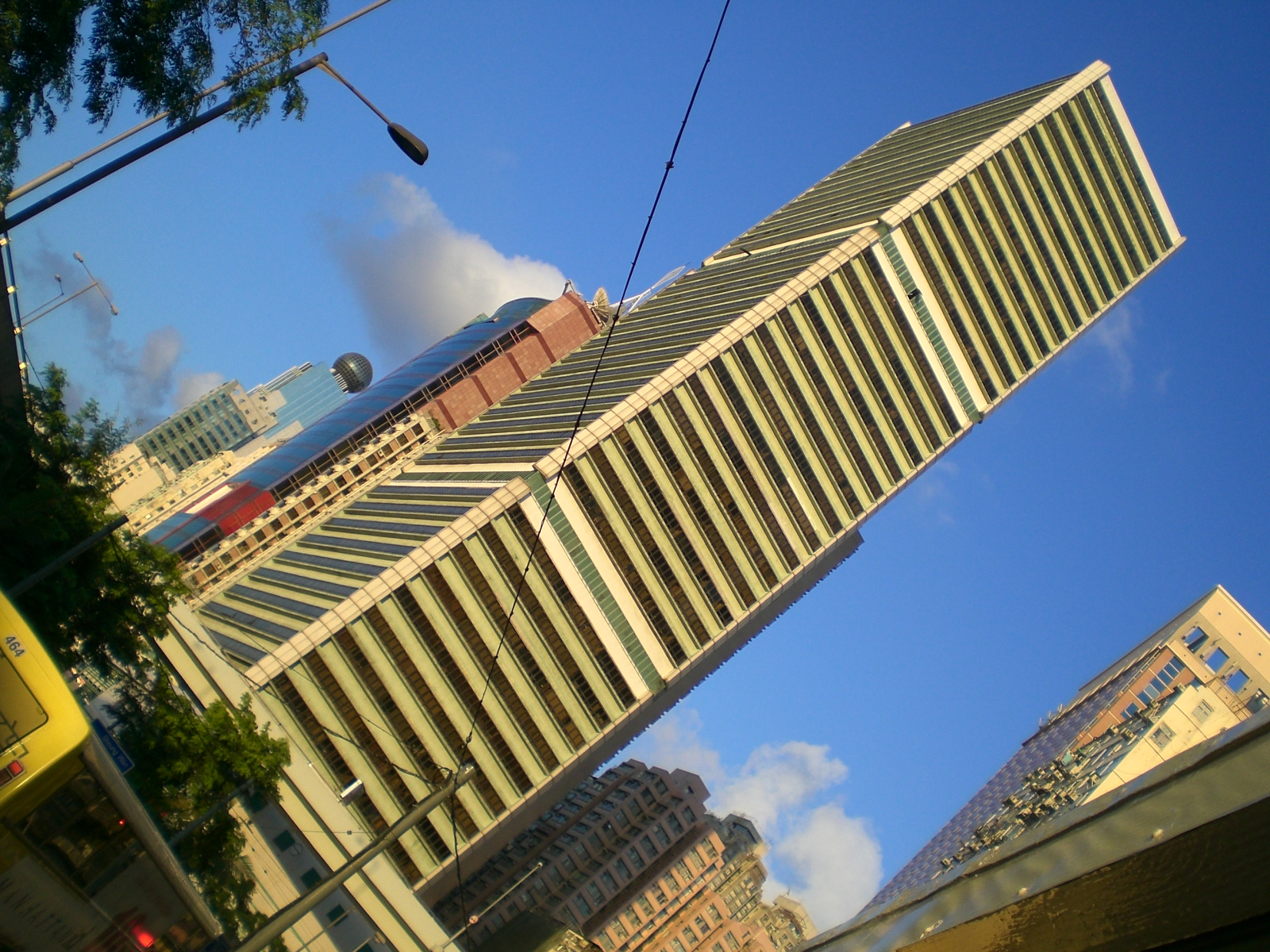

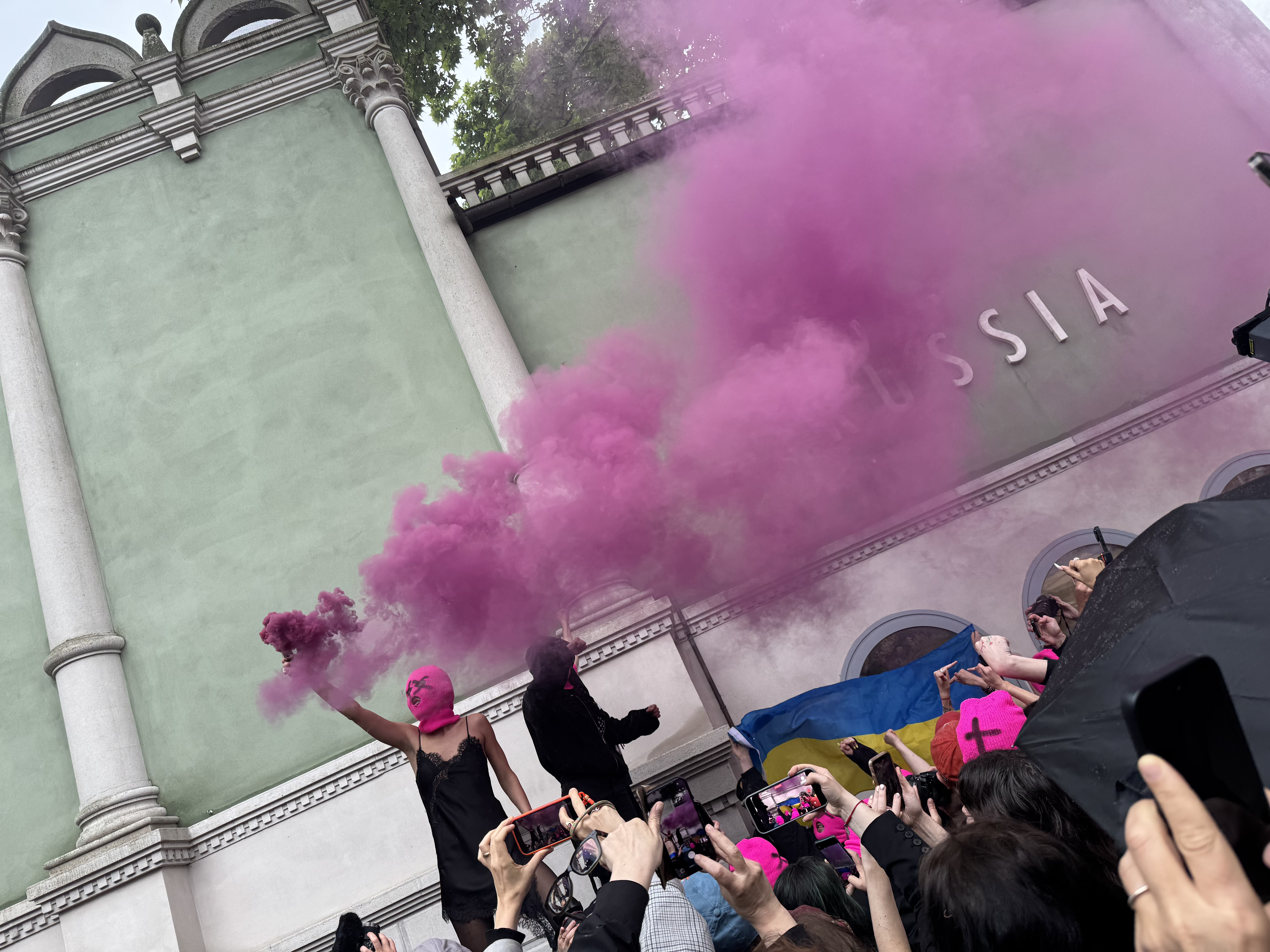
Venice Biennale protests in 2026

== See also ==
- Dolly zoom – In-camera effect that appears to undermine normal visual perception
