= Two shot =

Cinematic technique

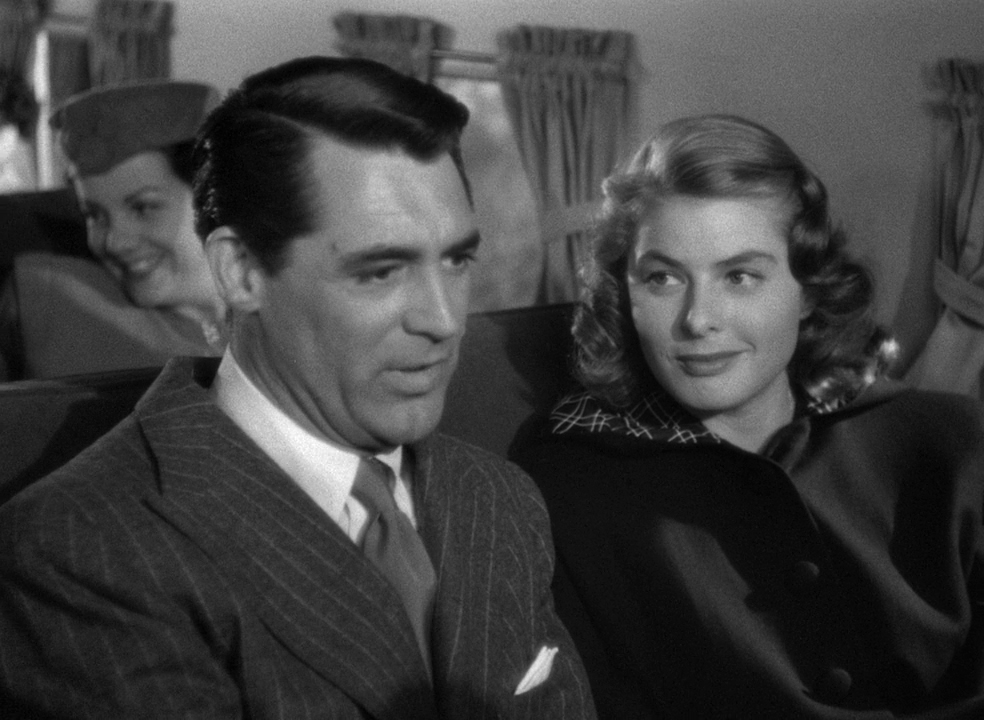
Cary Grant and Ingrid Bergman in a classic two shot from the 1946 Alfred Hitchcock film Notorious

A two shot (or, for short, two) is a type of shot in which the frame encompasses two people (the subjects). The subjects do not have to be next to each other, and there are many common two shots which have one subject in the foreground and the other subject in the background.

== Overview ==
Classic two shots are shot with a medium lens, head to knees or closer (the term two shot is shorthand for "medium two shot"), and show the characters so that both of their faces can be clearly seen. Common variations include two people in profile, one person in profile and the other 3/4 or full towards camera, two people looking towards camera either side by side or with one behind the other, one person with their back to the other while the other looks at them, either profile, 3/4, or full face, or the mirror two shot.

An "American two shot" shows the two heads facing each other in profile to the camera.

In a "two shot west," two characters will begin a conversation face-to-face, then one character will turn 180° away from the other character while the other character keeps looking at them, and they will continue with the conversation. This enables both characters to appear together in a single shot directly facing the audience. It is primarily seen in American soap operas.

In a "full two shot," the two characters are shown from head to toe. A "wide two shot" is a master shot showing two people using a wider lens, including an overview of their surroundings. A "close two shot" is a close-up with two people's heads in the frame, shot with a long lens. This framing is often used for shots of two people kissing or in moments of great dramatic tension.

In classic movies, long takes were often used in which several types of shots were used without cutting. For instance, if two people are talking facing the camera in a medium shot and the foreground character turns their back to the camera, the shot turns into an "over the shoulder" or "OTS" shot. If that character then walks towards the character in the background with both characters in profile, the shot turns into a full two shot. If the camera moves closer, the shot becomes a medium two shot again, and so on.

Similarly, a three shot has three people featured prominently in the composition of the frame.

In contrast, the term "one shot" has another meaning: it is used to describe a whole film, sequence or scene captured in one continuous take, usually footage without actual or noticeable cuts.

Shots that frame only one actor are called single shots (or short singles).
