= Eyeline match =

Film editing technique

An eyeline match from The Stranger (1946) between shots of Edward G. Robinson's character and a clock tower

An eyeline match is a film editing technique associated with the continuity editing system. It is based on the premise that an audience will want to see what the character on-screen is seeing. An eyeline match begins with a character looking at something off-screen, followed by a cut of another object or person: for example, a shot showing a man looking off-screen is followed by a shot of a television. Given the audience's initial interest in the man's gaze, it is generally implied on the basis of the second shot that the man in the first was looking at the television, even though the man is never seen looking at the television within the same shot.

Alfred Hitchcock's Rear Window, for example, makes frequent use of eyeline matches. The main character, played by James Stewart, is confined to his apartment and often looks out its rear window at events in the buildings across from him. Hitchcock frequently cuts from Stewart looking off-screen to various people and events that are assumed to be the focus of his gaze.

Eyeline match also refers to the practice of setting off-camera eyelines for single shots of characters within a scene such that, when these shots are cut together, each of the characters appear to be looking at the correct character, without any confusion. Factors influencing the position of the off-camera eyeline (usually by placing the other actors off camera but sometimes by giving the on-camera actor a mark to look at) include the 180 degree rule, camera lens/height/distance to subject and geography of the set. For instance, matching close-ups of two actors in a scene would be shot on the same lens with the camera placed at a matching height (either the same height, or at the off-camera actor's height or the on-camera actor's height) and distance, with the off-camera actor positioned equidistant from the lens and on opposite sides so that Actor A looks off camera right and Actor B looks off camera left.
