= Low-angle shot =

Camera angle

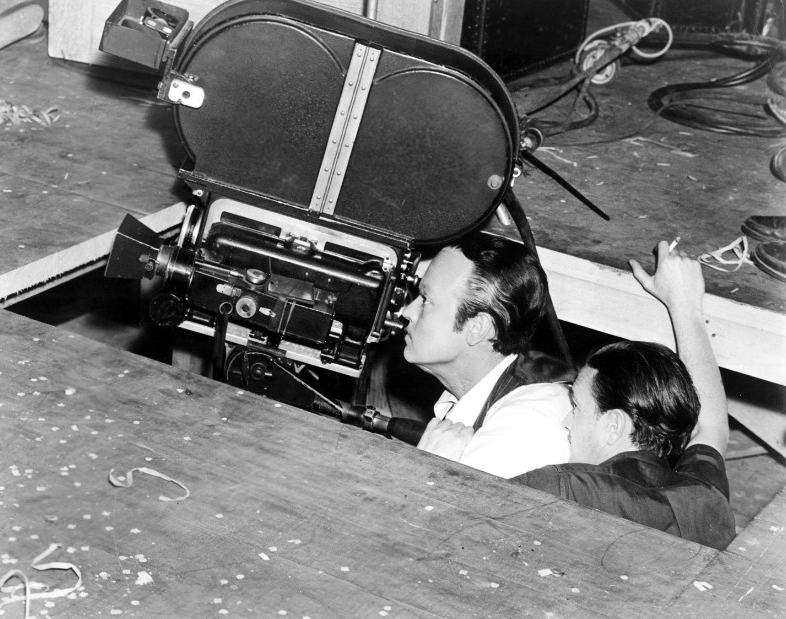
Low-angle shot being filmed for Citizen Kane, in which a hole was cut in floor of the studio to achieve the perspective desired for the scene.

A low-angle shot from Big Buck Bunny

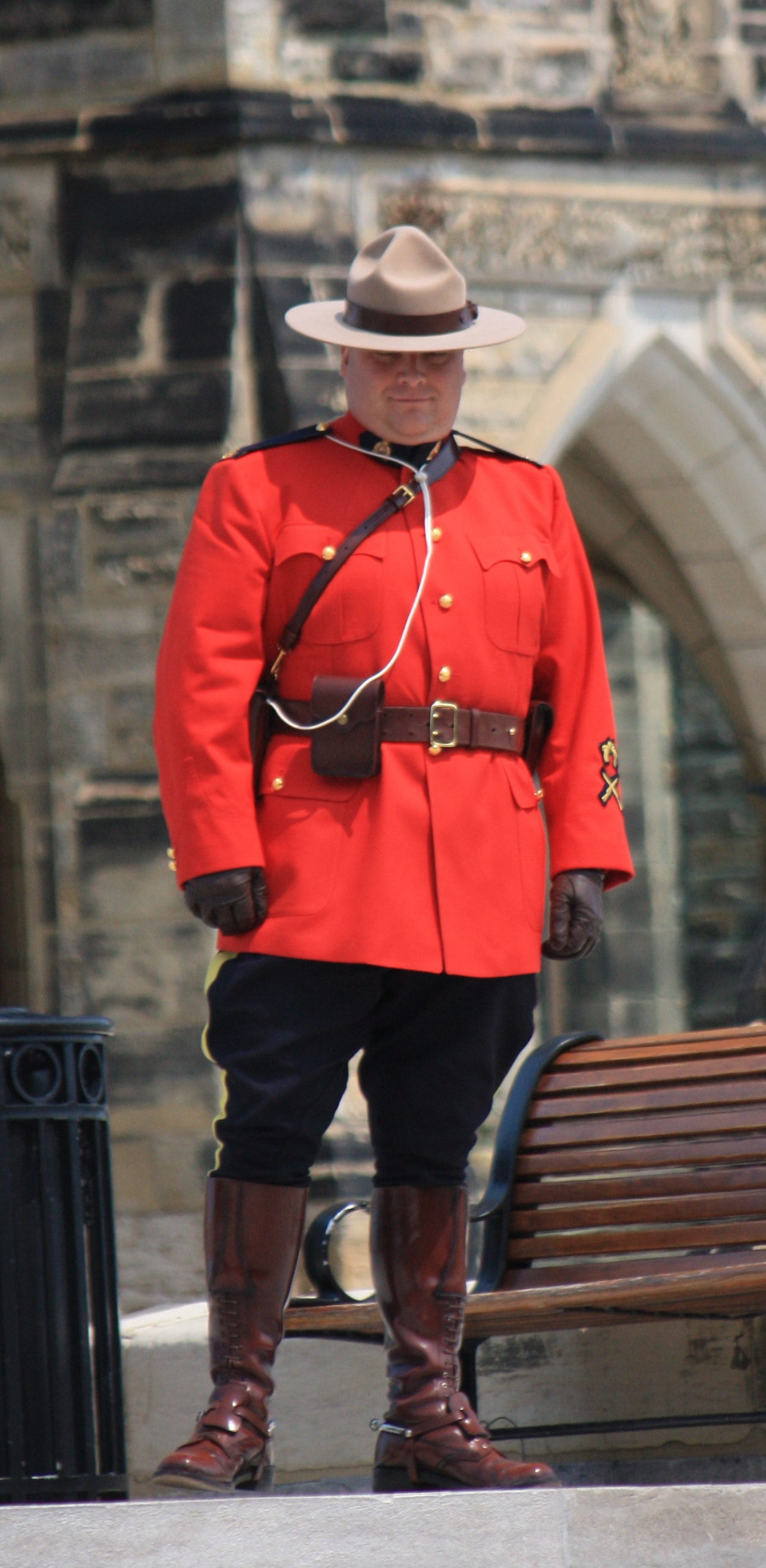
A Royal Canadian Mounted Police officer photographed from a low angle looks more imposing.

In cinematography, a low-angle shot, is a shot from a camera angle positioned low on the vertical axis, anywhere below the eye line, looking up. Sometimes, it is even directly below the subject's feet. Psychologically, the effect of the low-angle shot is that it makes the subject look strong and powerful.

It could be simply put as an angle closest to the floor and looking up towards the subject.

== Famous examples ==
- M (1931) (directed by Fritz Lang): Inspector Karl Lohmann is shot in low angle in his office, the camera sitting underneath his office desk. Also, two disputing men, one small and the other tall, are shot in low and high angles, respectively.
- Citizen Kane (directed by Orson Welles): there are many examples such as during the scene where Kane fires Leland. In fact, the scene where Leland confronts Kane after his defeat in the election is entirely shot in a low angle view.
- Godzilla (ゴジラ, Gojira) (directed by Ishirō Honda): Godzilla is shot from a low angle mostly throughout the movie.
- Psycho (directed by Alfred Hitchcock): the house where Norman Bates lives is usually shot from a low angle.
- Star Wars (directed by George Lucas): Darth Vader is often shot at a low angle, for example, the first time we see his character as he is walking down a hallway.
- Touch of Evil (directed by Orson Welles): Hank Quinlan is often shot in low angle to make him look menacing, large, and in-charge.
- Saturday Night Fever (directed by John Badham): In the famous opening sequence, there are several shots from a low angle to emphasize Tony Manero's delusions that he is untouchable.
- The Lady From Shanghai (directed by Orson Welles): examples of low-angle shot are during the scene where George Grisby is confronted by Broome and he shoots him.
- Used while filming World Wrestling Entertainment interviews with André the Giant.
- The Dark Knight (directed by Christopher Nolan): Nolan uses extremely low angle shots to give the Joker a more powerful image in The Dark Knight, especially during the scene where the truck he was driving is flipped over and he gets out and starts shooting at Batman. In this scene, the angle actually goes from a normal medium close up and slowly moves into a low angle shot.
- Full Metal Jacket (directed by Stanley Kubrick): examples of a low angle shot is during the scene where Gunnery Sergeant Hartman is yelling at Joker.
- The Untouchables (directed by Brian De Palma): there is a low-angle shot during the scene where Frank Nitti is being searched outside the courtroom and Eliot Ness finds the matches with Malone's address.
- Dr. Strangelove (directed by Stanley Kubrick): General Jack D. Ripper is shot at a low angle while smoking a cigar, in order to look comically menacing.

== See also ==
- Camera angle
- Worm's-eye view
