= Establishing shot =

Shot setting up context for a scene

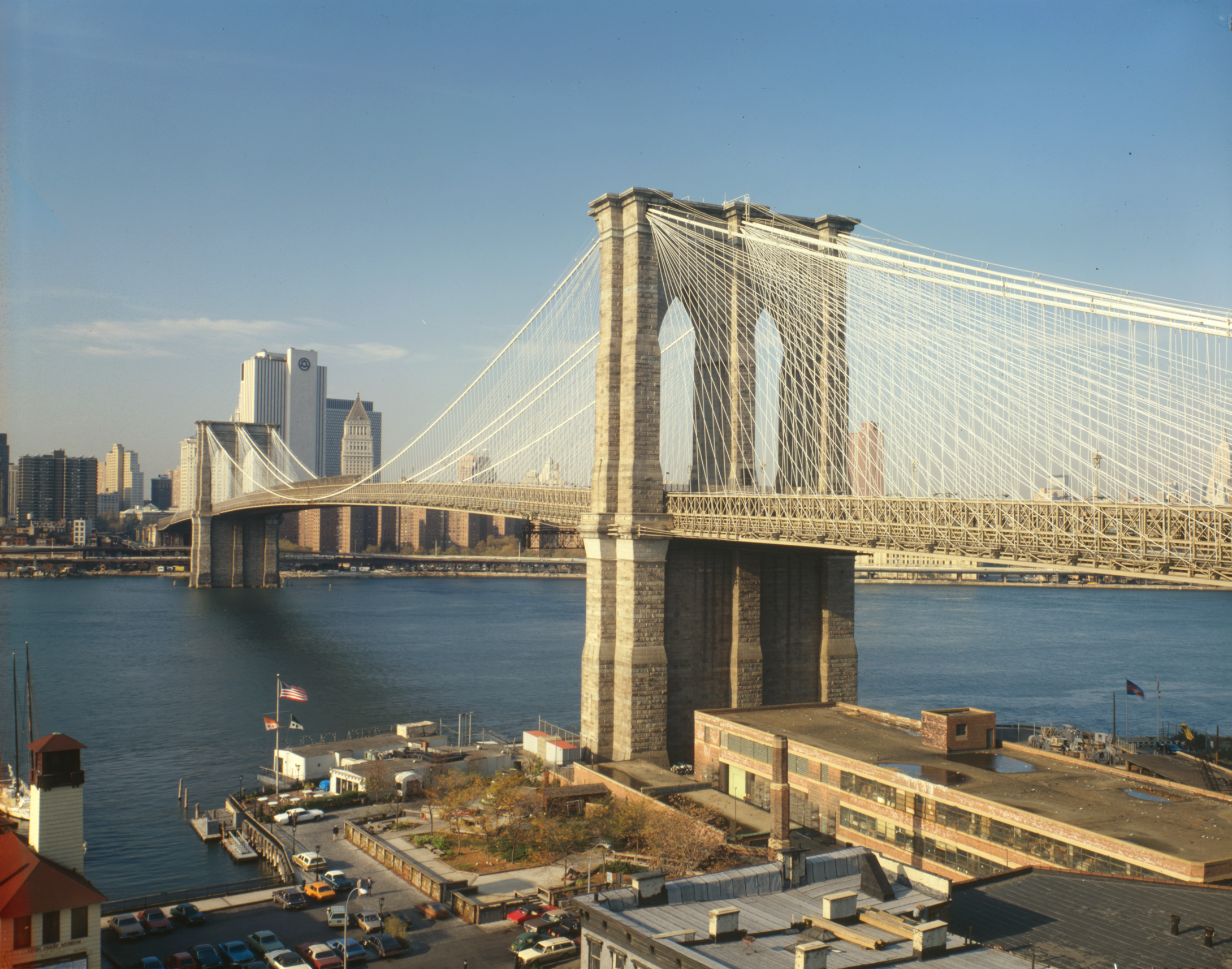
An opening shot of the Brooklyn Bridge establishes the setting and trajectory of the film Saturday Night Fever.

An establishing shot in filmmaking and television production is a shot that sets up, or establishes, the context for a scene by showing the relationship between its important figures and objects. It is generally a long or extreme-long shot at the beginning of a scene indicating where, and sometimes when, the remainder of the scene takes place.

Establishing shots were more common during the classical era of filmmaking than they are now. Today's filmmakers tend to skip the establishing shot in order to move the scene along more quickly, or merely mention the setting in on-screen text (as is done in the Law & Order franchise). In addition, the expositional nature of the shot may be unsuitable to scenes in mysteries, where details are intentionally obscured or left out.

== Use of establishing shots ==
Location
Establishing shots may use famous landmarks to indicate the city where the action is taking place or has moved.

Time of day
Sometimes the viewer is guided in their understanding of the action. For example, an exterior shot of a building at night followed by an interior shot of people talking implies that the conversation is taking place at night inside that building – the conversation may in fact have been filmed on a studio set far from the apparent location, because of budget, permits, time limitations or convenience. In the series JAG, 24-hour Coordinated Universal Time was used for these scenes to reinforce the military setting of the series.

Relationship
An establishing shot might be a long shot of a room that shows all the characters from a particular scene. For example, a scene about a murder in a college lecture hall might begin with a shot that shows the entire room, including the lecturing professor and the students taking notes. A close-up shot can also be used at the beginning of a scene to establish the setting (such as, for the lecture hall scene, a shot of a pencil writing notes).

Concept
An establishing shot may also establish a concept, rather than a location. For example, opening with a martial arts drill visually establishes the theme of martial arts. A shot of rain falling could be an establishing shot, followed by more and more detailed look at the rain, culminating with individual raindrops falling.
