= Index of motion picture–related articles =

Articles related to the field of motion pictures include:

== 0–9 ==
180-degree rule – 3D film – 3Delight – 3D LUT – 3ds Max – 4-point lighting setup – 16 mm film – 35 mm film – 70 mm film –

== A ==
Aa–Am

A roll – Above-the-line – Academy Awards – Academy of Motion Picture Arts and Sciences – Achromatic doublet – Acousmatic – Acting – Actinic light – Actor – Actress – Actuality film – Adobe After Effects – Adobe Premiere Elements – Adobe Premiere Pro – AVS Video Editor – Aerial image – Aerial shot – Aliasing – Alliance Atlantis – Alternate-frame sequencing – Ambient light – American Cinema Editors – American Federation of Television and Radio Artists – American Film Institute – American Indian Film Festival – American National Standards Institute – American night – American Society of Cinematographers – American shot

An–Az

Anamorphic – Angle of view – Angular resolution – Animation – Animation camera – Animation director – Animator – Anime – Answer print – Anti-aliasing filter – Apparatus theory – Aperture – A-Plot – Arc lamp – Arri – Arri bayonet – Arri PL – Arri standard – Arriflex D-20 – Art department – Art director – Art film – Artificial light – ASA – ASA speed rating – Aspect ratio (image) – Assistant director – Audio engineering – Audition – Auteur theory – Autoconform – Autodesk – Autoethnography – Autofocus – Automated dialogue replacement – Available light – Avar – Avid Technology – Axial cut – Axis of action –

== B ==
B roll – Back light – Backlot – Background light – Background lighting – Bailin bracket – Balloon light – Barrel distortion – Barn doors – Bayer filter – Beat (filmmaking) - Below-the-line – Best boy – Beta movement – Bigature – Billing – Bird's eye shot – Black-and-white – Blaxploitation – Bleach bypass – Bluescreen – B-movie – Body double – Bolex – Bollywood – Boom operator – Boom shot – Boomerang (lighting) – Bounce board – Breaking down the script – Breathing (lens) – British Academy of Film and Television Arts – British Board of Film Classification – British Independent Film Awards – British Film Institute – Bronson Canyon – Burnt-in timecode – Butterfly (lighting)

== C ==
Ca–Cm

C-Stand – Cahiers du cinéma – Callier effect – Cameo lighting – Cameo role – Camera angle – Camera assistant – Camera crane – Camera crew – Camera Dolly – Camera magazine – Camera operator – Canadian pioneers in early Hollywood – Cannes Film Festival – Casting Agent – Casting – Casting couch – Catering – Celluloid Closet – Celluloid ceiling – César Award – Changing bag – Character animation – Charisma – Chiaroscuro – Chroma key – Chromatic aberration – Chronophotography – Cinelerra – Cinema 16 – CinemaDNG – Cinemaphile – CineMagic – Cinemascope – Cinematheque – Cinematic techniques – Cinematographer – Cinematography – Cinéma vérité – Cineon – CinePaint – Cinerama – Circle of confusion – Circle-Vision 360 – Clapperboard – Clapper loader – Close-up – Closed captioning – Closing credits

Cn–Cz

Cold open – Color correction – Color gel – Color grading – Color rendering index – Color timer – Colour-separation overlay – Columbia Pictures – Compositing – Composition – Computer-generated imagery – Continuity – Continuity editing – Continuity clerk – Cooke triplet lens – Costume design – Costume designer – Costume drama – Costumer – Crafts service – Crane shot – Creative Artists Agency – Creative geography – Cross cutting – Cross-dressing in film and television – Cue (theatrical) – Cult film – Cutaway – Cutting on action

== D ==
Daily editor log – Daily rushes – Dance film – Day for night – Deep focus – Depth of field – Depth-of-field adapter – Development – Dialogue editor – Dichroic lenses – Diegetic sound – Diffraction – Digital audio – Digital audio workstation – Digital cinema – Digital Cinema Initiatives – Digital cinematography – Digital compositing – Digital film – Digital grading – Digital image processing – Digital intermediate – Digital Light Processing – Digital negative – Digital projection – Digital Theatre System – Digital video – Digital Visual Interface – Digital zoom – Direct broadcast satellite – Direct to Disk Recording – Director (film) – Director's cut – Directors Guild of America – Dissolve (film) – DMX (lighting) – Docudrama – Documentary film – Dolby Digital – Dolly grip – Dolly shot – Dolly zoom – Double-system recording – DPX file format – Drawn on film animation – Dream sequence – DreamWorks – DreamWorks Animation – Drug movies – Dubbing – Dutch angle – DV – DVD – Dykstraflex –

== E ==
Eclair camera – Edge code – Edit decision list – Editor's cut – Electrotachyscope – Ellipsoidal – Ellipsoidal reflector spot light – End credits – Entertainment law – Eroticism in film – Establishing shot – Experimental filmmaker – Exposure latitude – Expressionism (film) – Extra – Extreme long shot – Eye-level camera angle – Eyepiece –

== F ==
Fade-in – Fade-out – Fan film – Fast cutting – Fast motion – Feminist film theory – Field of view – Fill light – Film – Film colorization – Film crew – Film critic – Film criticism – Film director – Film distributor – Film editing – Film editor – Film festival – Film format – Film gate – Film genre – Film institutes – Film leader – Filmmaking – Film modification – Film noir – Film-out – Film plane – Film preservation – Film production – Film producer – Film punctuation – Film rating systems – Film recorder – Film restoration – Film scanner – Film school – Film score – Film speed – Film stock – Film styles – Film technique – Film theory – Film timing – Film treatment – Filming production roles – Filmizing – Filter (photography) – Final cut privilege – Final Cut Pro – First National Pictures – Fisheye lens – Flange focal distance – Flashing arrow – Flatbed editor – Flicker fusion threshold – F-number – Focal length – Focus (optics) – Focus puller – Focusing screen – Foley artist – Follow focus – Follow shot – Followspot light – Forced perspective – Foreshadowing – Formalist film theory – Found footage – Fourth wall – Frame – Frame rate – Frazier lens – Freeze frame shot – French hours – French Impressionist Cinema – Fresnel lantern – Fresnel lens – F-stop – Full frame – Full shot

== G ==
Gaffer – Gaffer tape – Garbage matte – Genesis – Genie Award – Genres – German Expressionism – Gobo (lighting) – Go motion – Godspot effect – Golden Globe Awards – Greenlight – Greensman – Grip –

== H ==
Hand-held camera – Hard light – Head-on shot – High-angle shot – High Definition – High-intensity discharge lamp – High-key lighting – High speed camera – History of cinema – Hollywood – Hollywood accounting – Hollywood cycles – Hollywood North – HandBrake – The Hollywood Reporter – Home video – Horror film – Hydrargyrum Medium-Arc Iodide lamp – Hyperfocal distance –

== I ==
IATSE – Image processing – IMAX – iMovie – In-camera effect – Independent film – Industrial Light and Magic – Insert – Intellectual montage – Intelligent lighting – Interlace – Intermittent mechanism – Internet Movie Database – Interruptible foldback – Intertitle – Iso-elastic – Italian neorealism –

== J ==
Jaggies – Jib – Jump cut –

== K ==
Key grip – Key light – Keying (graphics) – Keykode – Kinemacolor – Kinetoscope – Kino-Pravda – Kinopanorama – Klieg light – Kodak Theatre – Kuleshov Effect –

== L ==
LCD shutter glasses – Lekolite – Lens – Lens flare – Lens hood – Letterboxing – Light meter – Lighting technician – Lighting – Lighting control console – Lighting design – LightWave – Lightworks – Limato, Ed – Line producer – Linear filter – Linear timecode – Linear video editing – Lip flap – Lipstick camera – Location – Location manager – Location scouting – Location shooting – Log line – Long shot – Long take – Low-angle shot – Low-key lighting – Lucasfilm – Lucasfilm Animation – Lumapanel – Luminaire

== M ==
Machinima – Magic lantern – Make-up artist – Marxist film theory – Master shot – Match cut – Match moving – Matte – Maya – Medieval film – Medium shot – Method acting – Method filmmaking – Metro-Goldwyn-Mayer – Microphone – Mid shot – MIDI timecode – Mini35 – Mise en scene – Mixing console – Mockumentary – Montage – Mood lighting – Motion blur – Motion capture – Motion picture – Motion Picture Association – Motion Picture Association – Canada – Motion picture camera – Motion picture lighting – Motion picture rating system – Motion picture terminology – Movie projector – Movie star – Movie studio – Movie theater – Movies Filmed in Harlem – Movietone sound system – Moving light – Moviola – MPAA film rating system – Multicamera setup – Multiplane camera – Music editor – Music supervisor – Musical film

== N ==
Narrative film – Narrativity – National Association of Theatre Owners – National Film Board of Canada – National Film Preservation Board – National Film Registry – National Media Museum – Negative cutting – Negative pickup deal – Neo-noir – Neorealism – New Queer Cinema – Newsreel – Nickelodeon movie theater – Night for day – Nitrocellulose – Noise reduction – Non-diegetic insert – Non-linear editing – Normal lens –

== O ==
Offline editing – Oktoskop – On Location – One-light – Online editing – OpenEXR – Open content film – Opening credits – Optical composition – Optical effects – Optical printer – Optical zoom – Original camera negative – Orphan film – Outtake

== P ==
The Paley Center for Media – Pan and scan – Panavision – Panchromatic – PAR light – Paramount Pictures – Performance capture – Persistence of vision – Perspective distortion – Phi phenomenon – Photographic film – Photographic lens – Photometry – Pinnacle Studio – Pincushion distortion – Pinscreen animation – Pitch – Pixar – Pixilation – Point of view shot – Political Cinema – Pop filter – Pornographic movie – Post-production – PowerAnimator – Practical effects – Praxinoscope – Premium Picture Productions – Pre-production – Principal photography – Producer – Producers Guild of America – Production assistant – Production Code – Production company – Production designer – Production sound mixer – Production values – Progressive scan – Proof of concept – Propaganda film – Prop – Property master – Psychoanalytic film theory – Publicist – PV mount –

== R ==
Rack focus – Raster image – Reaction shot – Read-through – Re-can – Redress – Refractive index – Reframing – Remake – Rembrandt lighting – Rendering – Re-recording mixer – Retrofocus – Reversal film – RGB color model – Rig – Rostrum camera – Rotary disc shutter – Rotoscoping – Rough cut – Rule of thirds – Runaway production – Rushes –

== S ==
Sa–Sm

Scene lighting – Scoop lights – Screen Actors Guild – Screen direction – Screen test – Screenplay – Screenplay slug line – Screenwriter – Screenwriting – Screenwriting software – Screenwriting credit – Screwball comedy film – Scrim (lighting) – Script – Script breakdown – Script doctor – Script Supervisor – Second unit – Secondary animation – Sellmeier equation – Sequence (filming) – Sequence shot – Serial – Set (film and TV scenery) – Set construction – Set decorator – Set dresser – Shake (software) – Shallow focus – Shaw Brothers Studio – Shooting ratio – Shooting script – Short end – Short film – Shot (filming) – Shot reverse shot – Shutter angle – Shutter speed – Silent film – Single camera setup – Skywalker Sound – Slit-scan – Slow cutting – Slow motion – SMPTE – SMPTE color bars – SMPTE time code

Sn–Sz

Society of Motion Picture and Television Engineers – Soft light – Sony Pictures – Sony Vegas – Sound designer – Sound editor – Sound effects – Sound engineer – Sound mix – Sound recording – Sound stage – Soundtrack – Soviet movies of the year by ticket sales – Star Wars – Special effects – Split screen – Spydercam – Stage combat – Stage lighting – Stage lighting instrument – Stand-in – Standoff – Step outline – Stereoscopy – Stock footage – Stop motion – Stop trick – Striplight – Structuralist film theory – Stunt work – Stuntmen's Association of Motion Pictures – Subtitle – Sundance Institute – Superimpose – Surround sound – Suspension of disbelief – Swing gang – Synchronizer – Sync sound –

== T ==
Talkies – Talking head – Tally light – Technical achievement – Technicolor – Technirama – Techniscope – Telecine – Teleconverter – Telerecording – Television movie – Tessar formula – Test screening – Three-point lighting – Tilt – Time-lapse – Title sequence – Top grossing movie – Top-grossing movies in the United States – Toronto International Film Festival – Tracking shot – Trailer – Transgender in film and television – Treatment – Trilogy – Two-shot –

== U ==
Undercranking – Universal Studios – Utility sound technician –

== V ==
Varicam – Variety – Venice Film Festival – Vertical interval timecode – Video – Video assist – Video tap – Viewfinder – Vignetting – Vinegar syndrome – Virtual camera – VistaVision – Visual effects – Vitascope – Voice actor –

== W ==
Walla – Walt Disney Company – Warner Bros. – WGA screenwriting credit system – Wide-angle lens – Widelux – Widescreen – Wipe – Wire frame model – Wire removal – Wireless microphone – Women's Cinema – Workprint – Writers Guild of America –

== X ==
Xenon arc lamp – Xenon flash lamp – X-rated –

== Z ==
Zeiss Tessar lens – Zoetrope – Zoom lens – Zoopraxiscope –

== See also ==
- Outline of film
