= Scriptment =

Screenplay-style narrative outline for a film or television project

A scriptment (a portmanteau of script and treatment) is a written work by a movie or television screenwriter that combines elements of a script and a treatment. Most of the story is told in prose, as in a treatment, while dialogue passages are formatted as in a screenplay. It is a more elaborate document than a standard draft treatment and is comparable to a step outline. Some films have been shot using only a scriptment.

== Origin ==
The term scriptment was originally coined by filmmaker James Cameron, possibly during his early involvement in the development of the Spider-Man film series. In that effort, after the success of his 1984 film The Terminator, Cameron wrote a 57-page scriptment for the first proposed Spider-Man film, which was used by screenwriter David Koepp to write the first draft, incorporating it nearly word for word.

Cameron's scriptment for Titanic (1997) was 131 pages. The term became more widely known when Cameron's 1994 scriptment for the 2009 film Avatar was leaked on the internet during pre-production, although other directors, such as John Hughes and Zak Penn, had written scriptments before. The scriptment for Avatar and its notoriety caused the spread of the term.

== Elements ==
A scriptment borrows characteristics from both a regular screenplay and a film treatment and is comparable to a step outline: the main text body is similar to an elaborate draft treatment, while usually only major sequences receive scene location headings (slug lines), which is different from the extensive slug line formatting in standard screenplays, where every new scene or shot begins with an INT./EXT. DAY/NIGHT slug line set above the description or dialogue. However, just as a treatment can be short or long, a scriptment can exist in various degrees of completion depending on how much time the writer has devoted to it and a more fully developed one could have all slug lines in place, a great deal of dialogue, and only require the producer's (or a writing partner's) okay on the direction the finished script should take before proceeding further.

In a scriptment, scenes and shots may be separated as paragraphs or sentences and, if it is the writer's style, can also include an occasional explanatory note, such as might be important in an adaptation or a sequel. As with standard treatments, much of the dialogue is summarized in action. The longer the scriptment, however, the more likely it contains dialog scenes that are fully developed. Single words or brief phrases of dialogue can be included within the description and lengthier exchanges are formatted exactly as a regular screenplay, which is the main reason for the "script" part of the term.

The longer the scriptment, the more likely it is written shot to shot as opposed to scene by scene; thus, a long, detailed scriptment does not necessarily equate to a longer movie, as a typical 90-120 page screenplay written with master scenes contains many more individual shots than are immediately apparent.

A scriptment can begin with FADE IN: top left and conclude with a centered THE END. It can have a title page like a script and lengthier treatment. It is written single spaced with an empty space between paragraphs and other elements and the pages are numbered in the upper right corner, just as in a screenplay.

== Work-in-progress manuscript ==
Directors and screenwriters write scriptments as an intermediate stage in development from the draft treatment to the first draft of the screenplay. Like a draft treatment, a scriptment can be anywhere from 20 to 80 or more pages, while regular presentation treatments or outlines only summarize the plot, typically in not more than 30 pages.

- For the Batman feature film The Dark Knight (2008), writer David S. Goyer and the film's director Christopher Nolan wrote a scriptment that was then used by Nolan and his brother Jonathan Nolan to expand further into a finished screenplay. "I wrote what you'd call a 'scriptment' with Chris over an accelerated month long period, and then we handed it off to his brother [Jonathan], who did the first pass," explains Goyer.
- The sci-fi movie Transformers: Revenge of the Fallen (2009) reportedly used a scriptment during the screenplay writing process by Roberto Orci, Alex Kurtzman, Ehren Kruger and director Michael Bay.
- Filmmaker Wayne Spitzer used a scriptment while writing the adaptation of author Algernon Blackwood's 1907 supernatural short story "The Willows".
- Comic book writer Warren Ellis has written that he sometimes works in the scriptment style.

== Presentation manuscript ==
A scriptment can also be a presentation document; that is, one that is sold or handed in as the finished work.

- In 2005, Sony Pictures paid screenwriter Ken Nolan US $3 million for his 75-page scriptment that was an adaptation of the then-unpublished Whitley Strieber novel The Grays. Nolan had only one produced writing credit at the time, the screenplay for the military film Black Hawk Down, a project for which he had submitted three different scriptments to producer Jerry Bruckheimer and executive producers Mike Stenson and Chad Oman for approval during the writing process.
- Filmmakers Kriv Stenders and Richard Green used the scriptment format to make their 2007 film Boxing Day.
- The 2008 movie Cloverfield written by Drew Goddard, directed by Matt Reeves, and produced by J. J. Abrams, was greenlighted for production by Paramount Pictures President of Production Brad Weston and Brad Grey, Chairman, based on a 65-page scriptment. The film was also shot using the scriptment.
- The 2008 improv comedy movie The Grand, written by Zak Penn and Matt Bierman, was filmed using a scriptment. Penn said their scriptment "started at about 25 pages and it was just a document that explained who the characters were and what the scenes were."
- Also using a scriptment for filming was the 2008 comedy Reno 911!: Miami, written by Robert Ben Garant, Thomas Lennon, and Kerri Kenney-Silver.
- It was reported on the movie news website Ain't It Cool News on December 1, 2008 that a scriptment was involved in developing a possible new Speed sequel or remake: "There's a scriptment floating around that reintroduces Jack Traven. So the studios are hoping to get Keanu back on board."
- Director-producer-writer John Hughes wrote a 70-page scriptment for the Owen Wilson-starring comedy Drillbit Taylor (2008) that was used years later by screenwriters Kristofor Brown and Seth Rogen as the basis for a revised finished screenplay.
- The 2009 comedy film I Love You, Beth Cooper, written by Larry Doyle, originated as an 85-page scriptment that was shopped around Hollywood and then subsequently turned into a book manuscript.

== See also ==
- Film treatment
- Step outline
- Screenplay
- Spec script
