= Granby Manor Haunted House =

Haunted house in Yorktown, Virginia, U.S.

Granby Manor
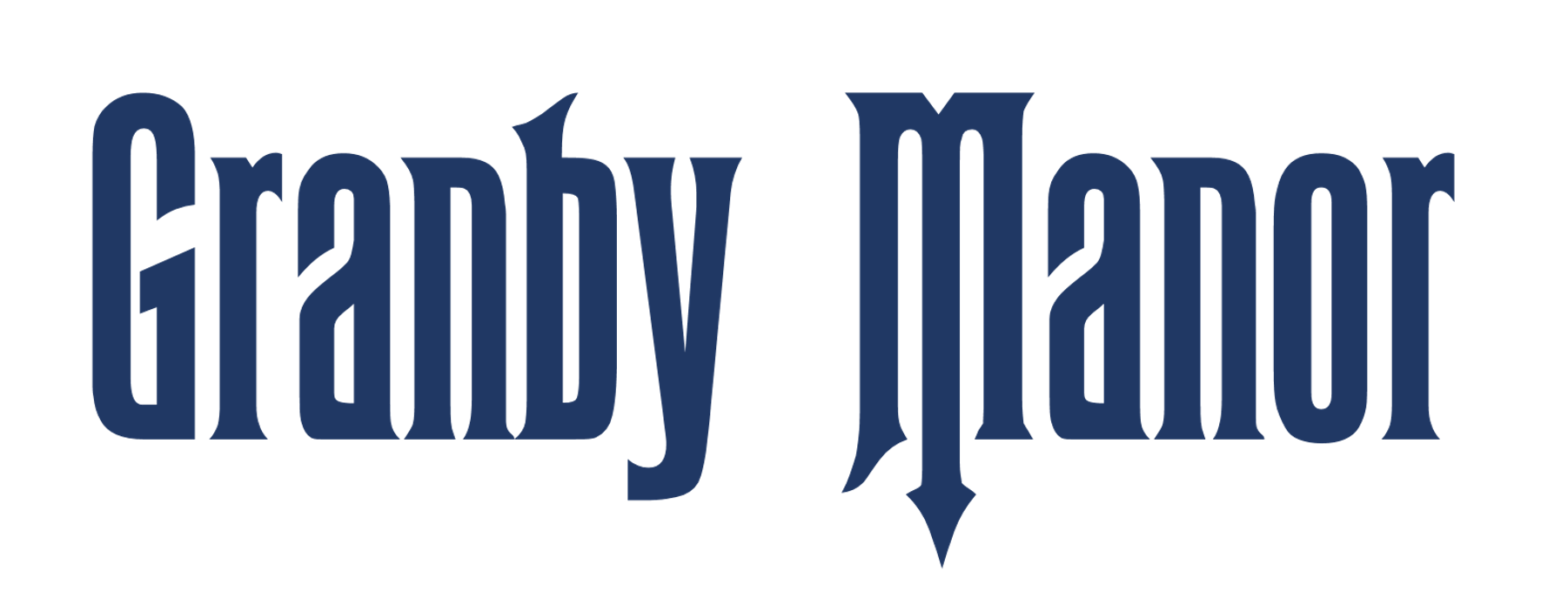

Yorktown, Virginia
- Name: Granby Manor
- Area: Port of York
- Status: Closed

2016 Season
- Opening date: October 7, 2016
- Closing date: October 29, 2016
- Replaced: Forbidden Haunted House

2017 Season
- Opening date: October 6, 2017
- Closing date: October 28, 2017
- Replaced: Granby Manor (2016)

Ride statistics
- Attraction type: Haunted house
- Manufacturer: MLA Industries and Entertainments, LLC
- Designer: Michael Allen
- Model: Haunted Mansion
- Participants per group: 10-12
- Duration: 16-20 minutes
- Live Actors: Yes
- Website: www.granbymanor.com/yorktown
- This is a pay-per-use attraction
- Wheelchair accessible
- Must transfer from wheelchair
- Closed captioning available

Granby Manor is a privately owned haunted house in Yorktown, Virginia. The walk-through attraction places its guests in an 1800s haunted manor, haunted by the Granby Family. The concept for the haunted house is loosely based on Disney's Haunted Mansion.

Granby Manor was the 5th annual haunted attraction operated by MLA Industries and Entertainments when it opened in 2016, and the 6th when it re-opened in October 2017.

== History ==
=== Development ===
The idea for an indoor attraction like Granby Manor predates all MLA Industries and Entertainments attractions. Early concept art from 2012 shows floor plans and sets similar to those of Granby Manor and Forbidden. However, the project was scrapped because of permitting issues and lack of funding.

The plans re-surfaced in May 2013, when Michael Allen took over as project manager at MLA Industries. Allen assigned set designer Alek Kowalcyk, who also provided the voice of the attraction's Ghost Host, to develop a dark ride vehicle that would be used in Forbidden haunted house. Kowalczyk created sketches of what he called the EPRV, or Electrically Propelled Rotating Vehicle, that would sit three passengers in each of its two rows. Each EPRV would have its own built-in motor, allowing the car to speed up, slow down, or stop completely as programmed. The cars would run on a main track in the center of the floor while a second guide rail would rotate the vehicle to face scenes as desired. Each EPRV would have an on-board computer that would relay information to a motherboard in the attraction's control booth, allowing several cars to operate at once. The idea was put aside later that year because of lack of funding, but the company has said that it plans to proceed with the plans in the future.

Meanwhile, Allen was to develop a background story for a haunted house based on the Haunted Mansion. He wrote a story about the unfortunate demise of the Smith family, which ended up being the basis for Forbidden haunted house. His story was later modified to match that of the 2003 Haunted Mansion movie. Other original stories include a magician that cursed his volunteers and an abandoned bed and breakfast. The name "Granby Manor" was created by designer Nathan Kowalczyk as a spin-off of the unofficial name of the Haunted Mansion, Gracey Manor.

In 2014 MLA Industries announced the opening of a haunted hotel attraction, featuring a stretching elevator and escape rooms. The haunted hotel was replaced with Forbidden because the theme seemed too dull.

== 2017 Refurbishment ==
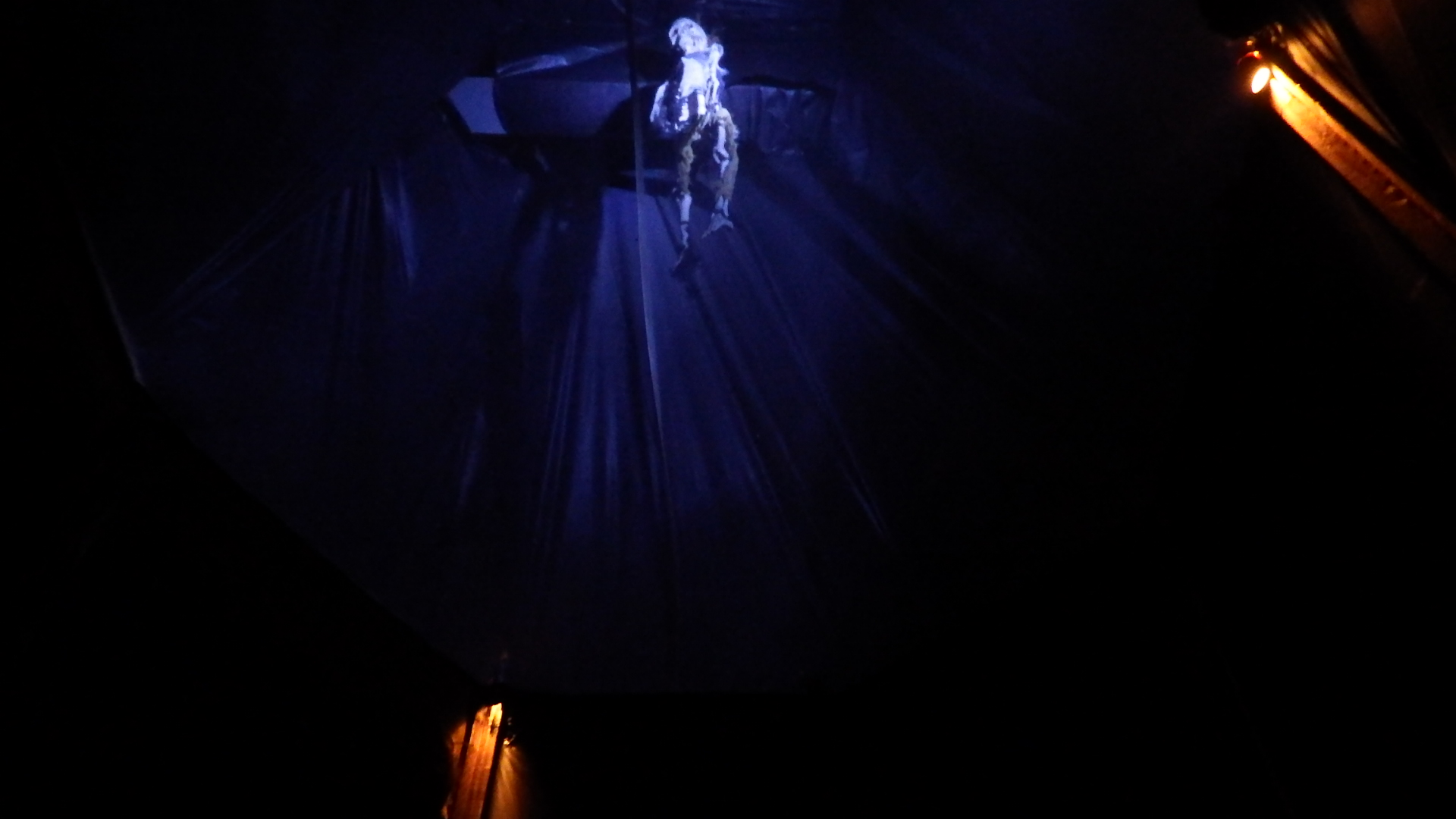
Octagon Chamber in 2016

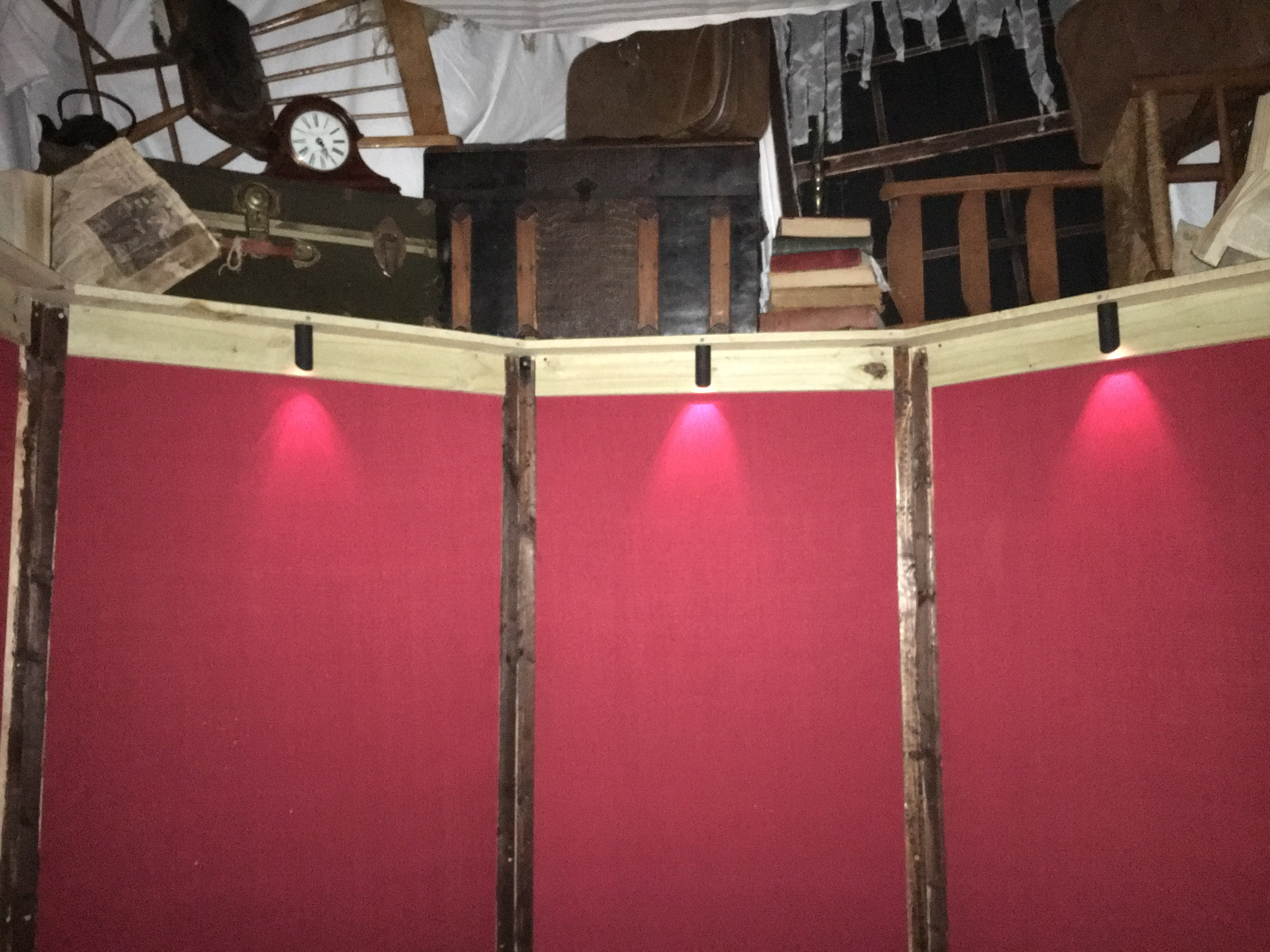
Octagon Chamber, renamed the Stretching Chamber for 2017

Unlike MLA Industries' previous attractions, which were completely overhauled and re-branded during the off-season, Granby Manor continued operation for two consecutive seasons. Many attraction elements were completely rebuilt and replaced with new set pieces and props. Two additional show buildings were also built in order to house the extended portions of the show.

=== Stretching Chamber and Attic ===
The first major addition is the Stretching Chamber, which replaced the octagon-shaped room and the scrim ceiling. The new room still has eight walls, but the ceiling in the Chamber rises, doubling the size of the room and revealing the previously hidden family attic. The attic is littered with crates, chairs, chests, books, and paintings. Mister Granby's corpse remains behind a scrim, however it is now hidden inside a painting instead of above the ceiling.

=== Madame Leota's Wagon ===
After exiting Deadwood Grove, guests climb up a flight of stairs into a seemingly calm séance wagon. Guests form a circle and hold hands in the parlor, while focusing on Madame Leota, a Gypsy medium that was brought in to conduct séances at the mansion and make contact with deceased members of the Granby family. Madame Leota begins uttering plaintive incantations: "Rap on a table; it's time to respond; Send us a message, from somewhere beyond!"

== Special effects ==
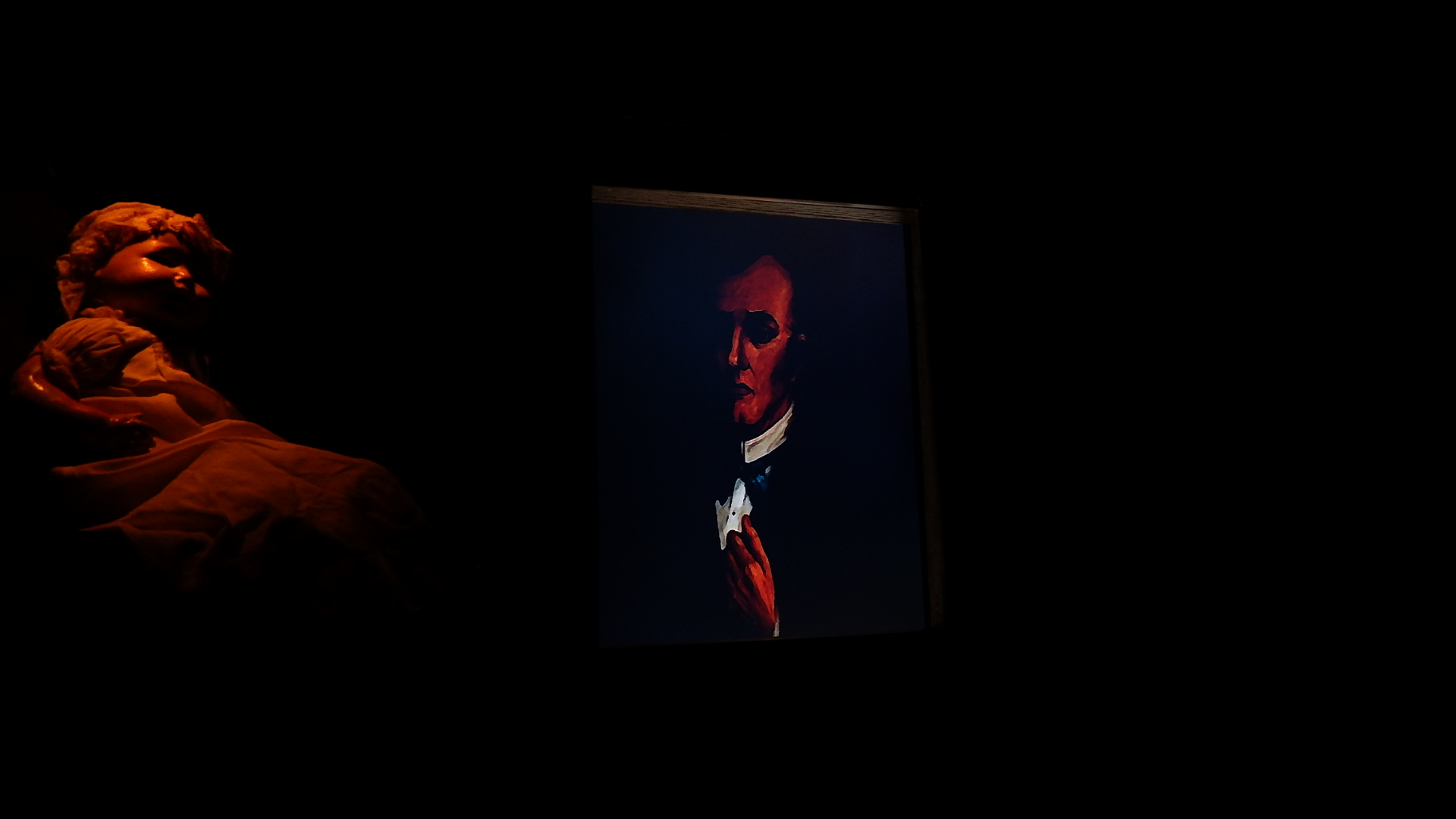
Master Granby's changing portrait

=== Haunted portrait ===
As the Ghost Host narrates in the foyer, Mister Edward Granby's portrait slowly transforms from a regular painting to a skeletal image. 24 images of the master's transformation are mirrored on a monitor hidden inside a painting. Each image is a separate queue synced with the narration and lightning, so the spiel can be sped up for a small group or slowed down for a bigger group.

=== Voice circling in Stretching Chamber ===
As the spiel runs in the Stretching Chamber, the Ghost Host's voice seems to dart and float fluidly around the room. This is achieved using a 7.1 Dolby Digital Surround system and 8 speakers that encircle the entire gallery, hidden behind the walls. The system is programmed to gradually cross-fade the audio from one speaker to the next. This is the most expensive special effect in the attraction, and eliminates the need for a "sweet spot" to fully experience the surround sound.

=== Hanging body and disappearing ceiling ===
When the lights in the Stretching Chamber fade out and lightning flashes in the rafters above the room, the ceiling disappears and Granby's hanging body is revealed. When the lights come back on, the ceiling is back and there is no sign of the body. This effect is achieved with the use of a scrim and strategically placed lighting. The body is always hanging in the rafters, just waiting for the guests to see it.The rope on which the body hangs is attached to a motorized pulley, making the skeleton swing from side to side.

=== Other effects ===
An array of fog machines, black lights, water nozzles, scent distributors, strobe lights, theatrical dust, air compressors, and electric firecrackers are used in the attraction.
