= Video sender =

Device for transmitting audio and video signals wirelessly

A video sender (also known as a DigiSender, wireless video sender, AV sender or audio-video sender) is a device for transmitting domestic audio and video signals Wirelessly from one location to another. It is most commonly used for sending the output of a source device, such as a satellite television decoder, to a television in another part of a property and provides an alternative to cable installations. Professional film sets use devices like the Teradek to transmit wireless video to a focus puller or a video village.

A wide range of video sender technologies exist, including analogue wireless (radio), digital wireless (spread-spectrum, Wi-Fi, ultra-wideband) and digital wired (power-line communication). Other, less common, technologies also exist, such as those that use existing Ethernet networks.

A typical video sender kit containing a transmitter, receiver, magic eye and a remote control to select the input.

Video senders have been a frequent cause of RF interference, particularly with car key fobs.

== Overview ==
Typical video sender applications include the transmission of television audio and video signals from a lounge to a bedroom or from a CCTV camera to a display, as well as interconnecting appliances with audio, video and Internet Protocol (IP) requirements.

Most video sender systems will consist of three separate components, a transmitter, a receiver and a remote control relay (also known as a magic eye or IR blaster). The transmitter is responsible for transmitting or broadcasting a connected audio-video device, while the receiver outputs that transmitted audio-video signal to a connected television. The remote control relay permits infrared remote controls to operate the equipment whose output is being transmitted.

As connectivity standards have changed in the television and audio-video markets, so it has in the video sender market, with older models usually featuring SCART and/or composite video and newer models featuring HDMI as their key means of connection to host equipment.

== Analogue Wireless ==
Analogue video senders have the advantage of low manufacturing costs as the audio and video signals are simply modulated onto a carrier at 2.4 GHz or 5.8 GHz. They do, however, have the adverse effect of causing reduced bandwidth to local Wi-Fi networks and, in some cases, Wi-Fi networks can cause picture interference on the video sender signal. More information can be found in the article on electromagnetic interference at 2.4 GHz. To avoid this, some video senders now use a spread-spectrum technology and can co-exist with wireless networks and share available bandwidth.

Usually there are four FM transmit channels, A, B, C & D, with stereo audio on 6.0 MHz and 6.5 MHz FM subcarriers added to the composite video baseband. These different channels can often be used to overcome the adverse effects of nearby WiFi networks.

The reverse remote control channel is usually fixed at 433.92 MHz, using whatever modulation is on the 34 kHz to 45 kHz IR remote "carrier". ASK/OOK schemes such as RC5 and RC6 work best over the RF link as the receiver uses a data slicer and AGC designed for ASK/OOK with Manchester encoding.

Analogue wireless video senders can achieve typical operating distances of up to 60 metres (200 ft) (clear line of sight) with DVD quality (720x576) video resolution and stereo audio.

== Digital Wireless ==
Digital video senders are quickly becoming the most popular solution and combine the use of a system on chip (used for audio and video encoding/decoding) with a means of transmitting the signal, such as spread-spectrum, Wi-Fi or ultra-wideband.

Early digital video sender models typically transmitted in DVD quality, but more recent models are capable of achieving 720p and 1080p high-definition resolutions.

Rear views of a spread-spectrum transmitter and receiver.

=== Spread-spectrum ===
Spread-spectrum techniques are methods by which a signal is deliberately spread in the frequency domain, resulting in a signal with a wider bandwidth. Within the video sender market, these techniques allow for a wireless signal to be transmitted with much less chance of interference from, and to, local Wi-Fi networks.

It is not uncommon for several Wi-Fi networks to be within range of a typical home and as such, spread-spectrum based video senders are often the best solution for transmitting audio and video signals within this crowded wireless environment.

Some manufacturers use proprietary spread-spectrum techniques, enabling typical operational ranges of up to 80 metres (260 ft) in-building. By also employing externally mounted antennas, operational ranges in excess of 2,000 metres (6,600 ft) (clear line-of-sight) have been achieved and several such models are sold under the Digi-Sender brand.

=== Wi-Fi ===
Video senders that operate on existing Wi-Fi networks have recently been developed and provide another interference free method of transmitting audio and video. Bandwidth over the Wi-Fi network will be shared between the video sender and all other connected devices, which can cause issues when used with older networking technologies, however this is not a problem with more recent 802.11n and 802.11ac technologies as the available bandwidth is so high. Due to the fact that they operate on the local Wi-Fi network, their range is limited, however Wi-Fi based video senders also allow for other interesting technologies to be included. These include technologies that allow for mobile device screen-mirroring, such as Miracast and AirPlay, as well as media streaming features such as DLNA.

=== Ultra-wideband ===
Ultra-wideband is a technology for transmitting information spread over a large bandwidth (>500 MHz) and is generally used for short-range applications (typically 10 metres (33 ft) or less) where a simple link is required from the source device to a monitor or television. As such, it is generally unsuitable for video sender applications that would require a signal to be sent to another room.

== Digital Wired ==
Example of how a power-line video sender works.

Several video sender technologies, such as power-line communication and HDBaseT, now exist that make use of existing networks, providing a wired video sender solution for distributing audio, video and internet connectivity around the home.

=== Power-line communication ===
Video senders using power-line communication make use of existing mains electricity circuits to send the audio and video signals. This provides similar benefits to a wireless video sender i.e. no additional cabling, as well as the ability to transmit in high-definition and even ultra-high-definition resolutions.

=== HDBaseT ===
In 2010 a new standard for cabled applications was released called HDBaseT a consumer electronic (CE) and commercial connectivity technology for transmission of uncompressed high-definition video (HD), audio, power, home networking, Ethernet, USB, and some control signals, over a common category (Cat5e or above) cable with a standard connector (RJ45).

== Legality ==
There are several issues which relate to the legality of video senders. The first is the manner in which the signal is being transmitted and the second relates to the copyright content of the material being transmitted such as DVDs and TV programmes.

=== Transmitting via radio within a home ===
Transmitting signals wirelessly requires the product to be tested to relevant standards for wireless license exemption, these products are generally limited to 100 mW (10 mW in the UK) and for higher power models, used generally within the broadcasting industry, a license is required. If the broadcast is across LAN or via similar IP technologies, such as the internet, then using streaming technology does not require a license. The regulator is the Federal Communications Commission (FCC) in the United States who are responsible for the efficient use of radio bandwidth.

=== Copyrighted programme material ===
A subscriber may wish to distribute TV to other televisions in the home and there is no limit to the number of TVs that can display the same signal. How the subscriber chooses to distribute his TV signals within his home is constantly changing. With an increasing number of TV displays around the home and a need for greater resolution the options continue to grow. Users are permitted to distribute copyright material provided it is being viewed by the subscriber or within the subscribers property. Generally, broadcasting copyright material (which applies to just about all broadcast channels) for viewing by members of the public is illegal. There have been a number of test cases where the rebroadcast of subscription channels and off-air channels to subscribers or publicly have been declared illegal.

=== Enforcement ===
Agencies responsible for the enforcement of wireless telegraphy equipment are as follows:

- United Kingdom: The Office of Communications, commonly known as Ofcom, is the government-approved regulatory and competition authority for the broadcasting, telecommunications and postal industries of the United Kingdom.
- United States: The Federal Communications Commission (FCC) regulates interstate and international communications by radio, television, wire, satellite and cable.
- Germany, The Federal Network Agency (German: Bundesnetzagentur or BNetzA) is the German regulatory office for electricity, gas, telecommunications, post and railway markets.
