= Flag (lighting) =

Stage accessory used to block light

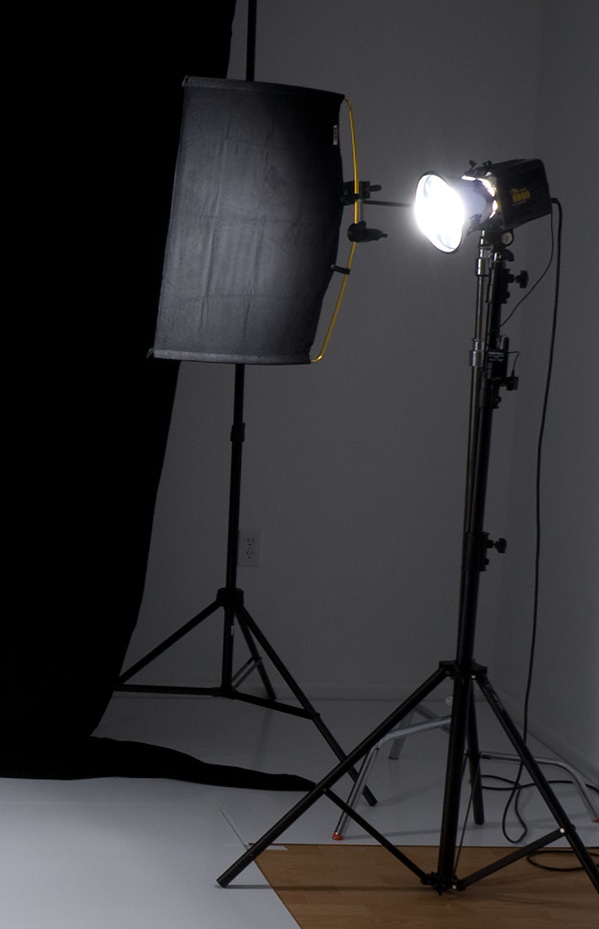
A solid flag keeping light off the backdrop to the left

A flag is a device used in lighting for motion picture and still photography to block light. It can be used to cast a shadow, provide negative fill, or protect the lens from a flare. Its usage is generally dictated by the director of photography, but the responsibility for placing them can vary by region, usually devolving to either the gaffer and electricians (in the UK and much of The Commonwealth) or the key grip and lighting grips (in the US and Canada).

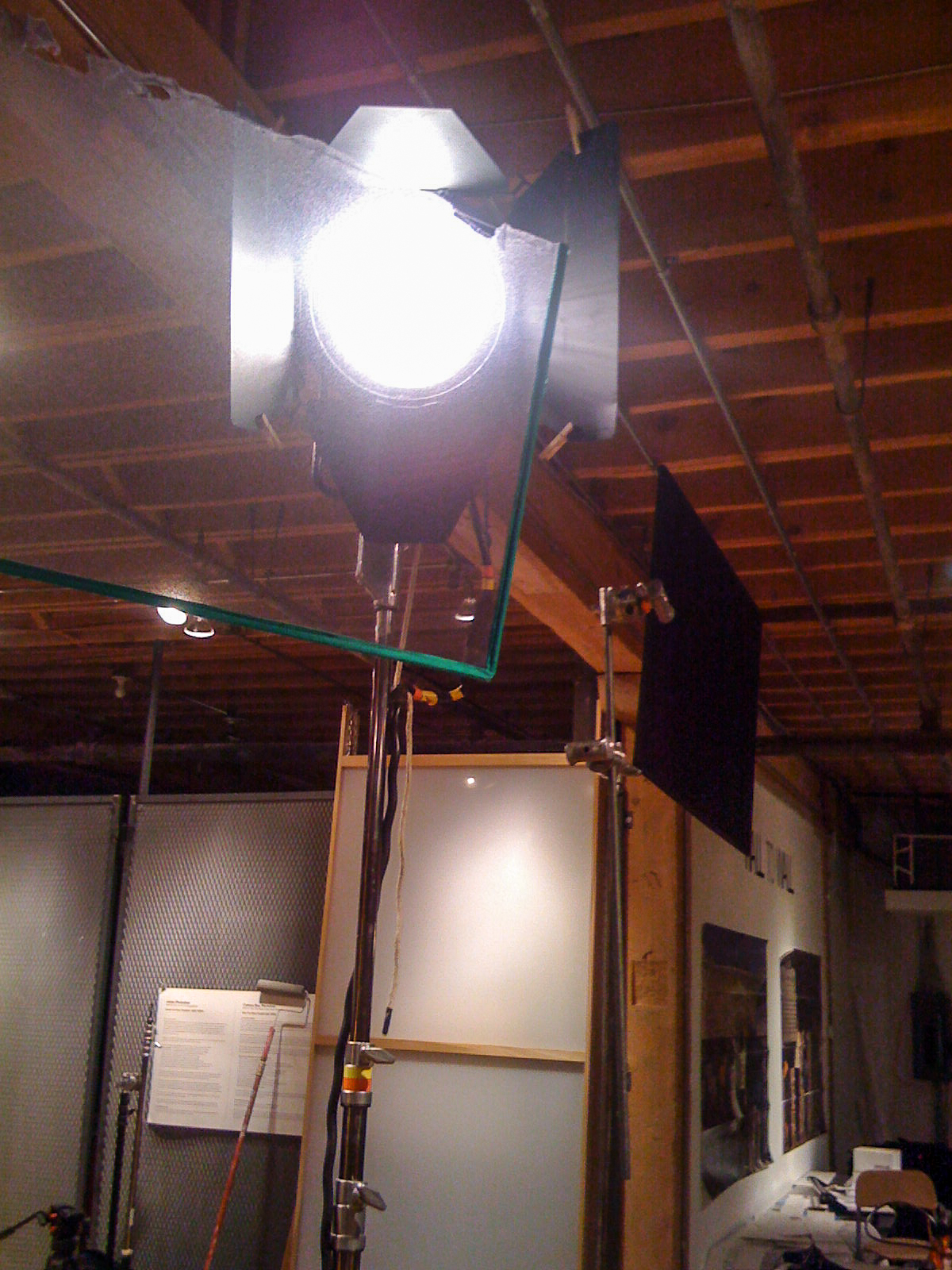
A transparent flag (scrim) with light shining through it

Flags come in a wide variety of shapes and sizes, from mere square inches ("dots and fingers") to many square feet ("meat axes"). Most "industry-standard" flags consist of a square wire frame stitched with black duvetyne, which minimizes any reflected light and keeps the flag lightweight. Flags are distinguished from larger light-cutting tools such as overhead rigs or butterflies in that they can be mounted on individual C-stands, as opposed to being affixed to collapsible frames.

The above notwithstanding, given smaller budgets or extenuating circumstances, virtually any opaque object can be used to flag light.

A smaller variant with an articulated arm, colloquially known as a French flag, is occasionally attached to the movie camera at the discretion of the focus puller (also known as the 1st AC) solely for the purpose of blocking light flares which the matte box and its accessories cannot reach.

== See also ==
- Best boy
- Clothespin § Filmmaking
- Dolly grip
- Film crew
- Gaffer
- Gaffer tape
- Scrim
- Butterfly (lighting)
