= Duvetyne =

Twill-woven fabric with a velvet-like nap on one side

Duvetyne, or duvetyn, (also known as Molton and Rokel) is a twill fabric with a velvet-like nap on one side. Duvetyne has a matte finish and its high opacity makes it ideal for blocking light.

It may be woven from cotton, wool, or—in rare cases, mainly in the early 20th century—silk. If made of cotton, it is usually called suede cloth. If wool or wool-blend, it is fulled, napped, and sheared. This entirely hides the weave, making it a blind-faced cloth.

Although it is most commonly used in the motion picture industry, early sources list duvetyne as a common fabric for dresses, suits, and coats. By the 1930s, however, it was widely noted for its use in constructing theatrical cycloramas and theater curtains.

In modern times, fire-retardant black duvetyne is commonly used for curtains, for scenery, and to control light spill. Many commercial lighting flags are made from duvetyne. When used in film applications, especially in the eastern United States, duvetyne is also known as "commando cloth".

In the first season of the original Star Trek television series, the exterior shots of "space" were created by gluing glitter onto black duvetyne.

== See also ==
- Broadcloth
- Monk's cloth
- Melton (cloth)
- Velour
