= Rembrandt lighting =

Lighting technique that is used in studio portrait photography

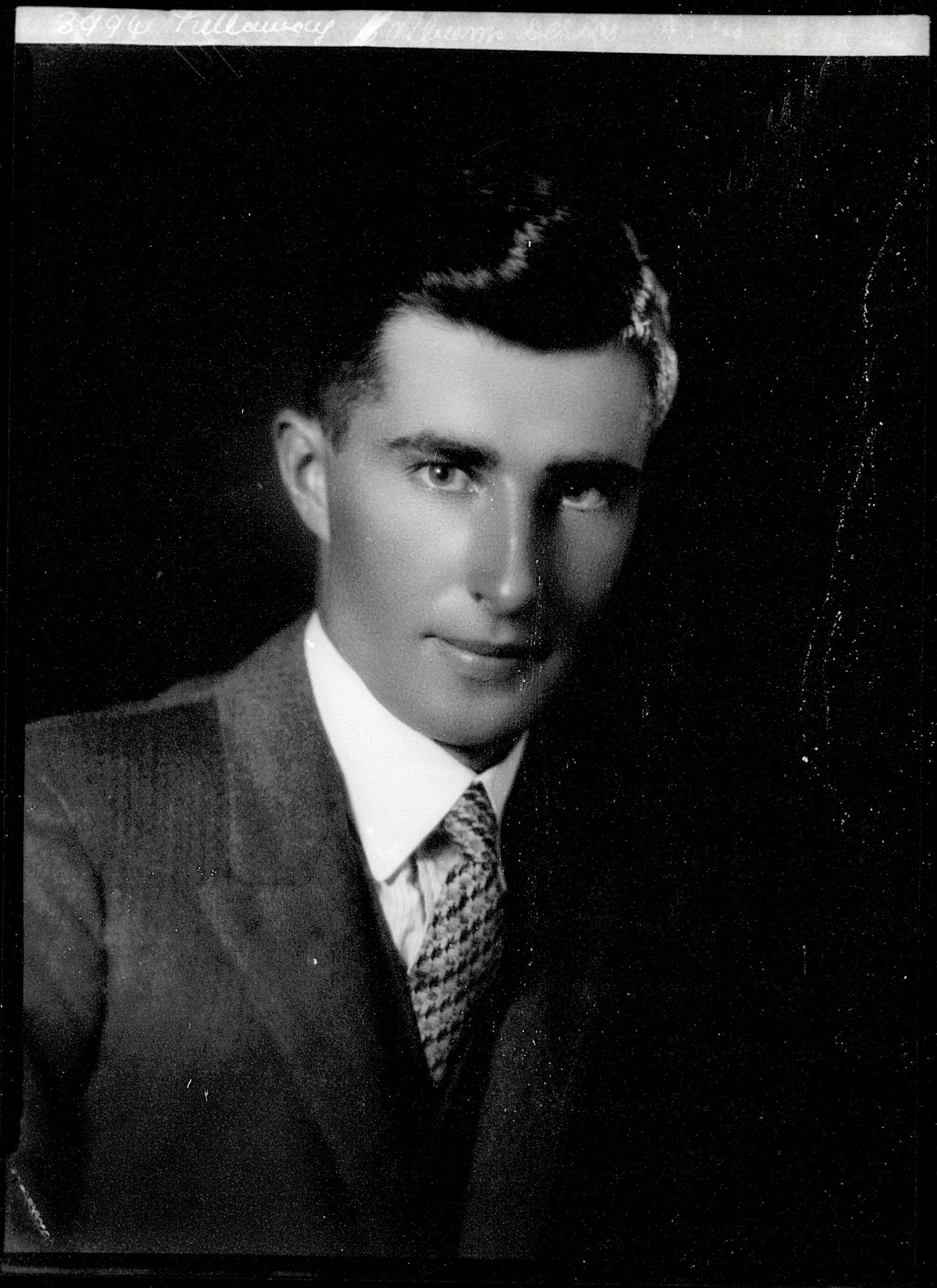
A studio portrait, showing the characteristic illuminated triangle on the darker side of the face

Rembrandt lighting is a standard lighting technique that is used in studio portrait photography and cinematography; it is also used in contrast with butterfly lighting

It can be achieved using one light and a reflector, or two lights, and is popular because it is capable of producing images which appear both natural and compelling with a minimum of equipment.

Rembrandt lighting is characterized by an illuminated triangle (also called "Rembrandt patch") under the eye of the subject on the less illuminated side of the face. It is named for the Dutch painter Rembrandt, who occasionally used this type of lighting.

== Description ==
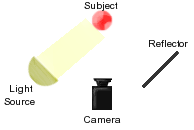
The typical Rembrandt lighting setup

Normally, the key light is placed high and to one side at the front, and the fill light or a reflector is placed half-height and on the other side at the front, set to about half the power of the key light, with the subject, if facing at an angle to the camera, with the key light illuminating the far side of the face. The key in Rembrandt lighting is creating the triangle or diamond shape of light underneath the eye. One side of the face is lit well from the main light source while the other side of the face uses the interaction of shadows and light, also known as chiaroscuro, to create this geometric form on the face. The triangle should be no longer than the nose and no wider than the eye. This technique may be achieved subtly or very dramatically by altering the distance between subject and lights and relative strengths of main and fill lights.

== Origin of photographic term ==
Pioneering movie director Cecil B. DeMille is credited with the first use of the term. While shooting the 1915 film The Warrens of Virginia, DeMille borrowed some portable spotlights from the Mason Opera House in downtown Los Angeles and "began to make shadows where shadows would appear in nature." When business partner Sam Goldwyn saw the film with only half an actor's face illuminated, he feared the exhibitors would pay only half the price for the picture. After DeMille told him it was Rembrandt lighting, "Sam’s reply was jubilant with relief: for Rembrandt lighting the exhibitors would pay double!"

== In film noir ==
While best known for its uses in painting and photography, Rembrandt Lighting is also one of the most commonly used tools of the film noir genre. Over the course of film noir's history, a litany of directors have used the distinct style to "evoke emotions and create a sense of mystery in a film noir.". The style of Rembrandt lighting is particularly useful in the making of film noir as, "It illuminates not just the physical landscape but also the emotional landscape of the characters." In a genre where character and setting are integrally linked, Rembrandt lighting provides an intimate insight into the characters mental state when used in film noir. The use of Rembrandt lighting in film noir is so extensive that the style has come to define this genre of film. Rembrandt lighting "is synonymous with the film noir genre, known for its crime, intrigue, and moral ambiguity. The contrast between light and shadow in film noir is as much a character as the actors themselves." Rembrandt lighting allows directors to manipulate the tone of a scene through its visuals, and in film noir is instrumental in conveying the shadowy nature of most plots. Hugely influential, the legacy of Rembrandt lighting in film noir can be seen in such films such as The Godfather and many more, showing the lasting impact it has on filmmaking as a whole. To achieve the look of Rembrandt lighting, directors of film noir would often use "low angle or off center camera angles" to help add to the uneasy feeling of film noir. This combination of lighting and camera work further helped define the look of the genre and established some of the cinematic tropes that film noir is best known for today. While not as well known as the dolly zoom or the long take, the use of Rembrandt lighting in a cinematic medium helped shape the trajectory of not only film noir but Hollywood as a whole.

== Gallery ==
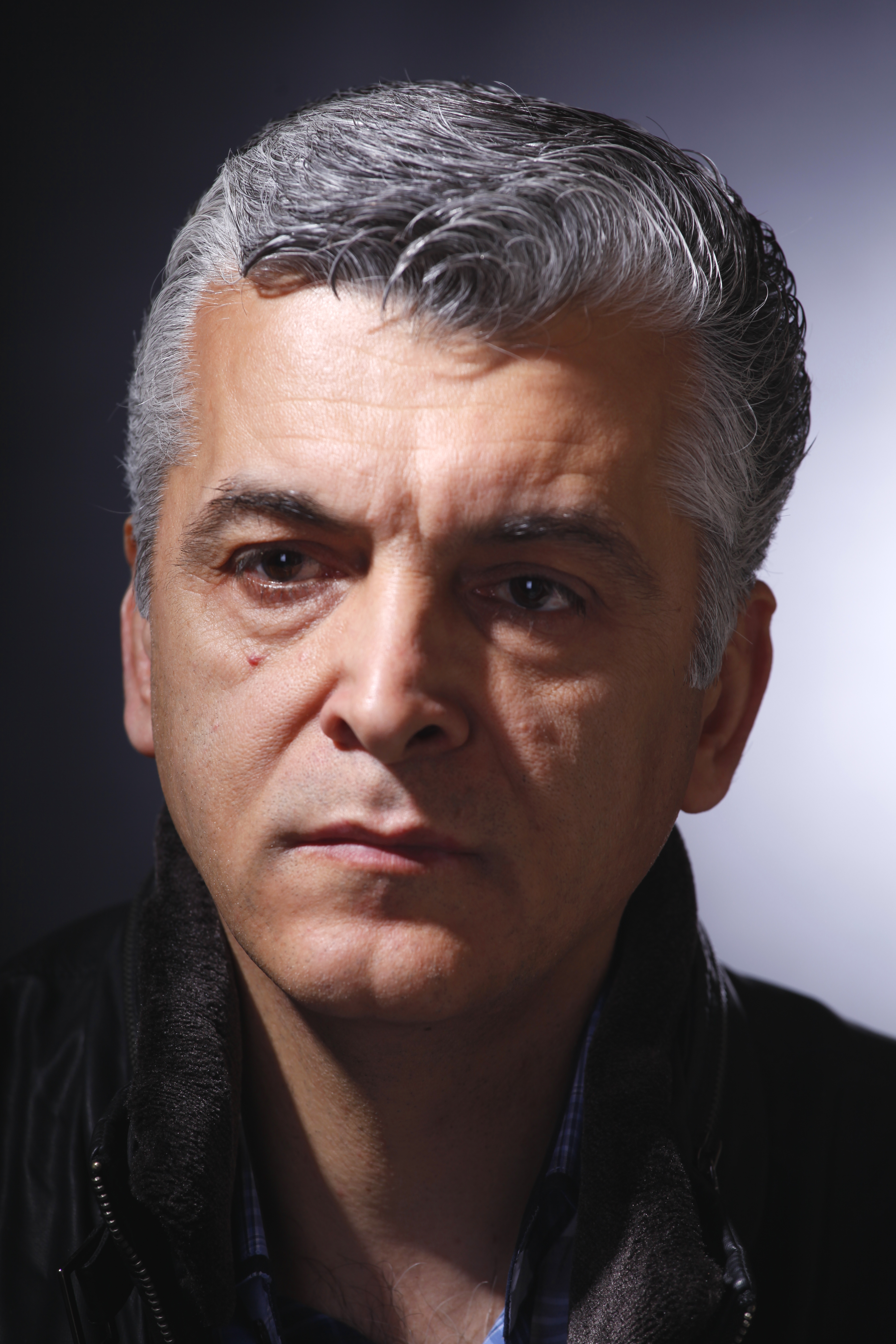
Portrait photograph

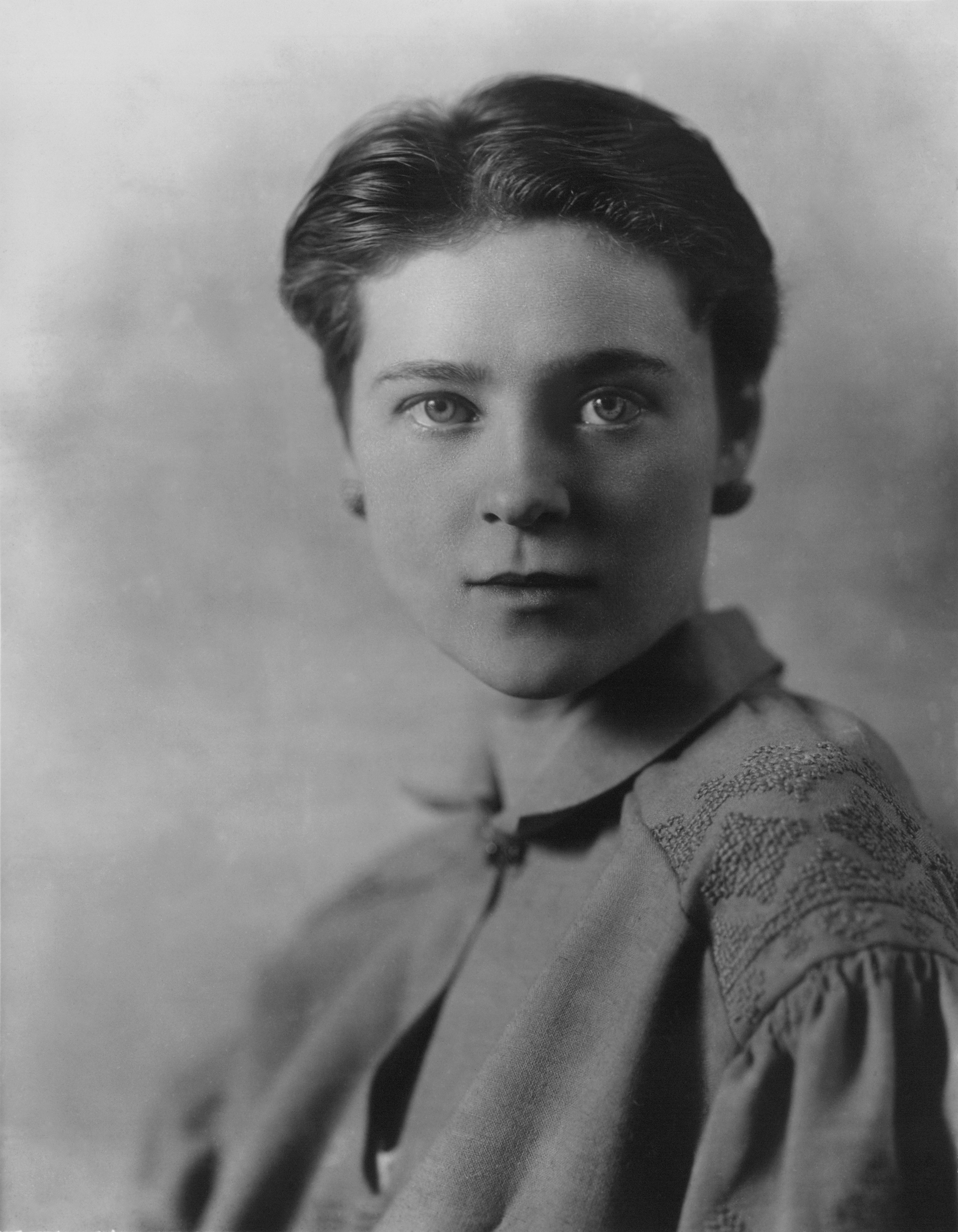
Subtle Rembrandt lighting in a studio portrait of Eva Le Gallienne

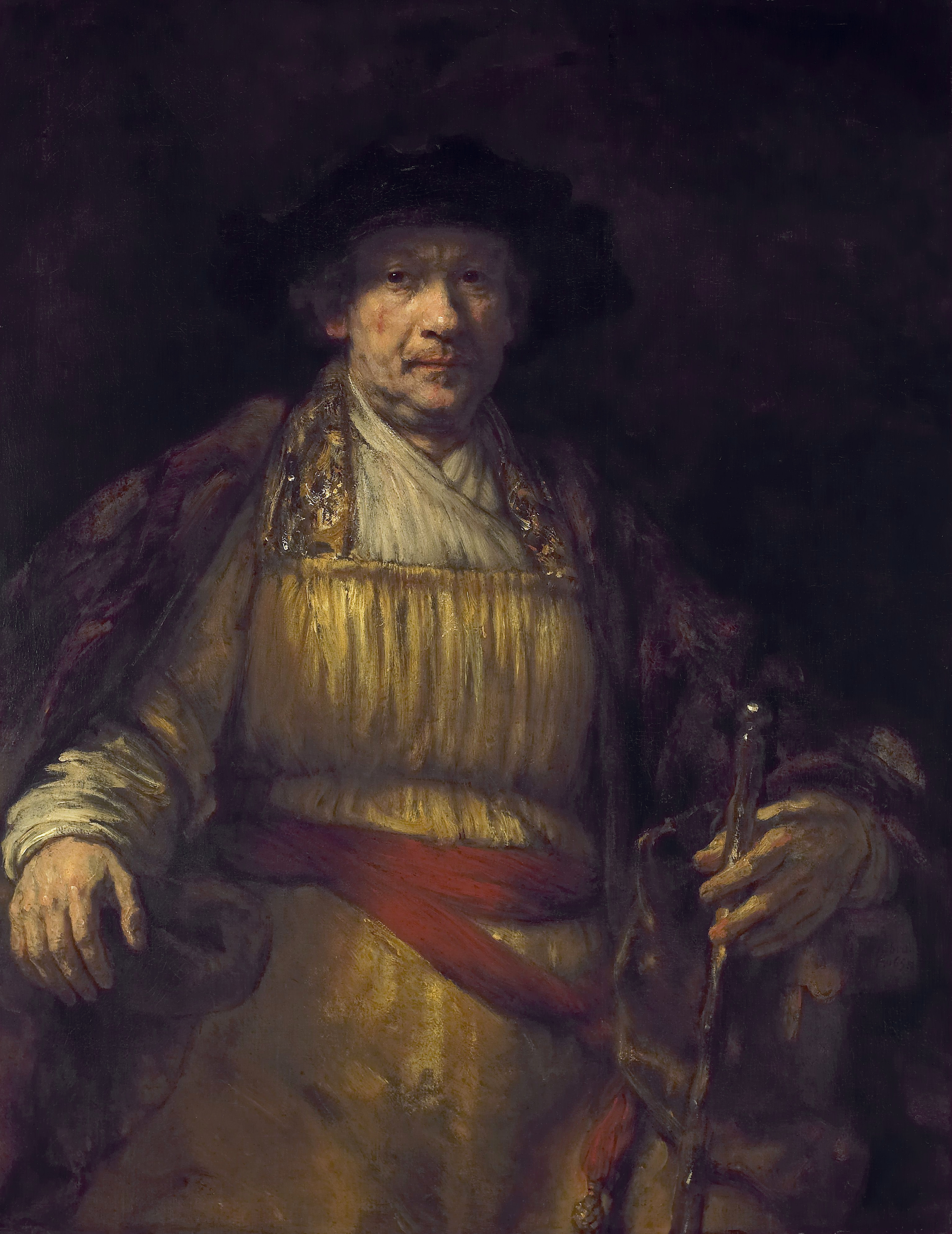
Self Portrait by Rembrandt
