= Film treatment =

Prose summary of a planned screenplay or script

A film treatment (or simply treatment) is a piece of prose describing the story of a planned screenplay for a motion picture or television program, or a script for a radio play. It is typically written during the development stage, before the first draft of the screenplay. It is generally longer and more detailed than a logline or one-page synopsis, and it may include details of directorial style that an outline omits. A treatment may also be created in the process of adapting a novel, play, or other pre-existing work into a screenplay.

A treatment differs from a step outline, which lists the story scene by scene, and from a beat sheet, which breaks the story into its major dramatic turning points.

== Format ==
Treatments read like a short story, but are told in the present tense and describe events as they happen. They are usually written in the third person, with little or no dialogue, and focus on the main characters, the major plot developments and the tone of the film.

== Types ==
Two kinds of treatment are commonly distinguished, depending on their purpose.

=== Original draft treatment ===
The original draft treatment is created during the writing process and is generally long and detailed. It consists of full-scene outlines put together. Lengths vary widely; some sources give figures between 30 and 80 pages in Courier 12 point. For example, the draft treatment of The Terminator is reported to be 48 pages long.

More elaborate forms of the draft treatment include the scriptment.

=== Presentation treatment ===
The presentation treatment is created as presentation material. Scene descriptions are written out on index cards (or a digital equivalent) and only have the essential story events that make up the scenes. The scene cards are arranged and rearranged until the optimum structure is worked out. It is the full story in its simplest form, moving from the concept, to the theme, to the character, to a detailed synopsis of about four to eight pages of master scenes.

Presentation treatments are used to show how the production notes have been incorporated into the screenplay for the director and production executives to look over, or to leave behind as a presentation note after a sales pitch. A presentation treatment is the appropriate one to submit if a script submission requires one. They are usually at least three, but fewer than thirty, pages in length, with most being seven to twelve pages.

== Usage ==
Treatments are widely used within the motion picture industry as selling documents to outline story and character aspects of a planned screenplay, whereas outlines are generally produced as part of the development process. Screenwriters may use a treatment to initially pitch a screenplay, but may also use a treatment to sell a concept they are pitching without a completed screenplay.

=== Television and adaptation ===
In television, a treatment may be used to present a series or an episode idea before a script is commissioned. When adapting an existing work, a treatment can be used to show how the source material will be restructured for the screen.

== See also ==
- Step outline
- Scriptment
- Beat sheet
- Logline
- Pitch (filmmaking)
- Screenplay
