= Step outline =

A step outline (also called a scene-by-scene outline or scene outline) is a detailed telling of a story with the intention of turning the story into a screenplay for a motion picture. It briefly describes every scene of the story, usually in the order in which the scenes will appear in the finished script.

A step outline is distinct from a treatment, which is written as continuous prose, and from a beat sheet, which typically breaks a story into its major dramatic turning points rather than listing every scene.

== Format ==
Each scene is summarized in a few lines, and scenes are often numbered in the order in which they occur for convenience. An entry commonly includes:

- the location and time of day, as in a scene heading;
- the characters present;
- the main action of the scene;
- indications of dialogue and character interactions.

Some writers also note what changes in the scene (a decision, a revelation, a shift in the relationship between characters).

=== Example ===
The following fictional excerpt illustrates the format:

1. INT. LIGHTHOUSE – NIGHT. Mara, the keeper, finds the logbook torn. She suspects her brother.
2. EXT. HARBOUR – DAWN. Mara confronts Tomas on his boat. He denies everything but avoids her eyes.
3. INT. TAVERN – DAY. A stranger asks Tomas about the lighthouse. Mara overhears from the next table.

== Uses ==
A step outline is generally written after the story idea or treatment and before the first draft of the screenplay. Writers use it to test the structure of a story, to locate scenes that do not advance the plot, and to reorder scenes before committing to full script pages.

It can also be an extremely useful tool for a writer working on a spec script, and it may be shared with producers, script editors or collaborators for feedback before a draft is written. In television, outlines are commonly submitted for approval before an episode is scripted.

== See also ==
- Treatment (filmmaking)
- Beat sheet
- Screenplay
- Three-act structure
- Index card
