= Day for night =

Technique to film night scenes in daylight

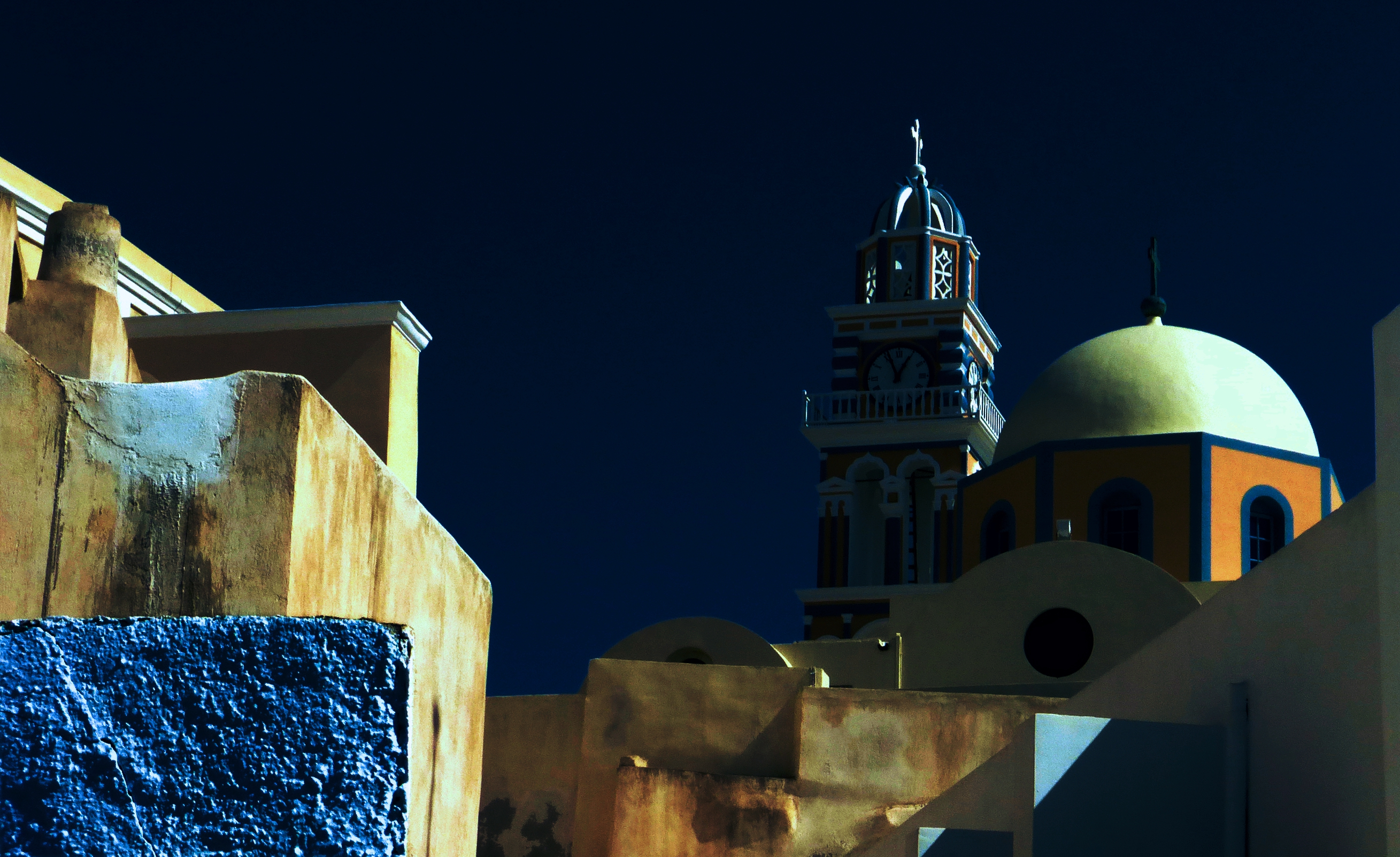
Though shot during the day, a scene can be made to appear as if it occurs at night.

Day for night (French: La nuit américaine, "the American night") is a set of cinematic techniques used to simulate a night scene while filming in daylight. It is often employed when it is too difficult or expensive to actually film during nighttime. Because both film stocks and digital image sensors lack the sensitivity of the human eye in low light conditions, night scenes recorded in natural light, with or without moonlight, may be underexposed to the point where little or nothing is visible. This problem can be avoided by using daylight to substitute for darkness. When shooting day for night, the scene is typically underexposed in-camera or darkened during post-production, with a blue tint added. Additional effects are often used to heighten the impression of night.

As the light sensitivity of film and video cameras has improved, shooting day for night has become less common in recent years.

== Techniques ==
Although moonlight is not blue, it appears bluish to the human eye due to the Purkinje effect. Photographers in the late 19th century exploited this effect by using various chemical techniques to adjust the contrast and color of pictures. Stage productions similarly adopted the use of blue-tinted lighting to illuminate night scenes. This convention continued with silent films, which required a well-lit scene to capture images at the frame rate but often tinted night scenes in blue. To give a bluer appearance to scenes filmed in color, some techniques use 3200K tungsten-balanced rather than 5000K daylight-balanced film stock. The tungsten balance renders artificial lighting (street lights, headlights, lit windows, etc.) as white and unlit areas as "moonlight blue." With professional video cameras, color temperature adjustments are made to achieve the same effect. With digital post production now nearly universal, the color temperature adjustment is usually made in camera, to preserve the "white" artificial lights, but scene darkening is left to post production for finer control of the effect.

Underexposing the film can add to the illusion of darkness or moonlight. It is typical to underexpose by about two stops. A neutral-density filter is often used to achieve this darkening, so that the camera aperture remains unchanged.

Daytime sky can be darkened to simulate night. With black and white film, a red lens filter will turn a blue sky black. Infrared film is occasionally used for long shots, but it renders green foliage as white. Yellow or orange filters (Wratten 8 or 15) can be substituted for closer shots, to preserve the performers' flesh tones. With color film or video, a graduated neutral-density filter can achieve a similar effect, as can a polarizing filter. Using either of these filters can limit camera movement during a shot, as the axis of a graduated filter must match the horizon, and the effect of the polarizing filter changes as the axis of the camera lens moves relative to the sun. If the scene is backlit by the sun for a "moonlight" rim light effect, faces and other foreground details may be too dark to see properly. Partially filling shadows with reflectors or a 5000K (daylight-balanced) key light can compensate for this. Even so, shadow areas are still slightly under-lit, to match the higher contrast of the overall scene.

Example day for night process
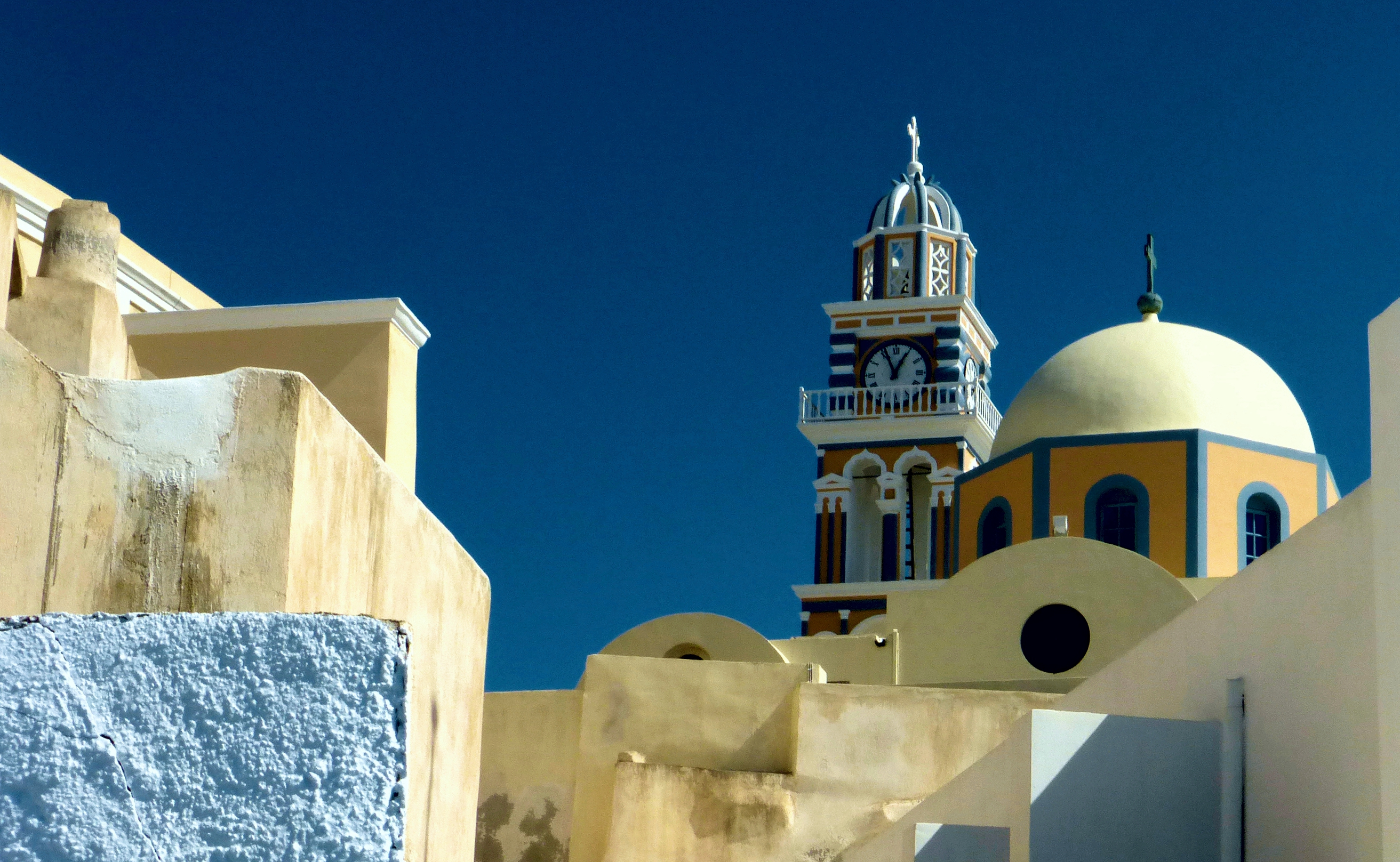
Original, unprocessed image

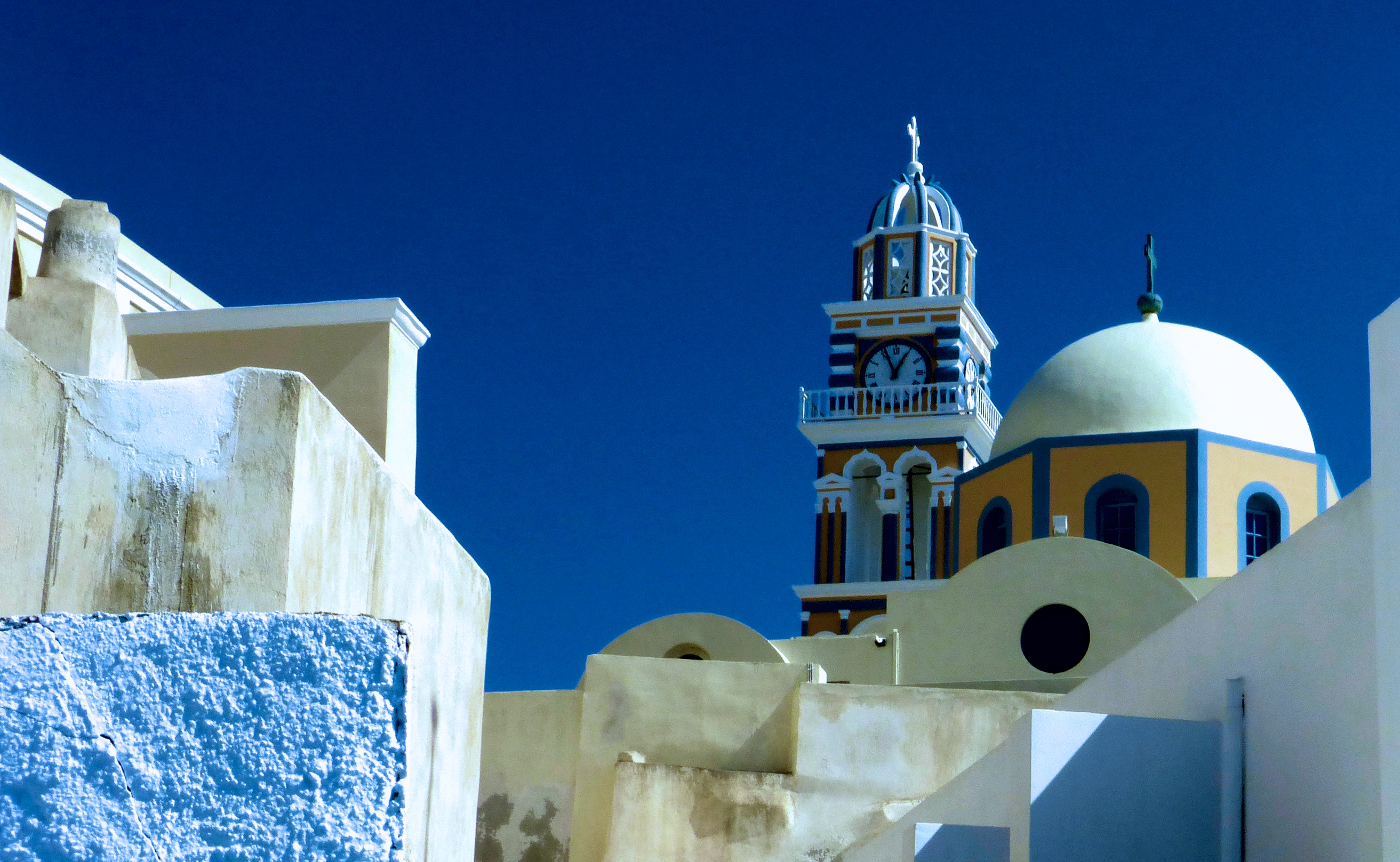
Bluish tint added by altering color temperature

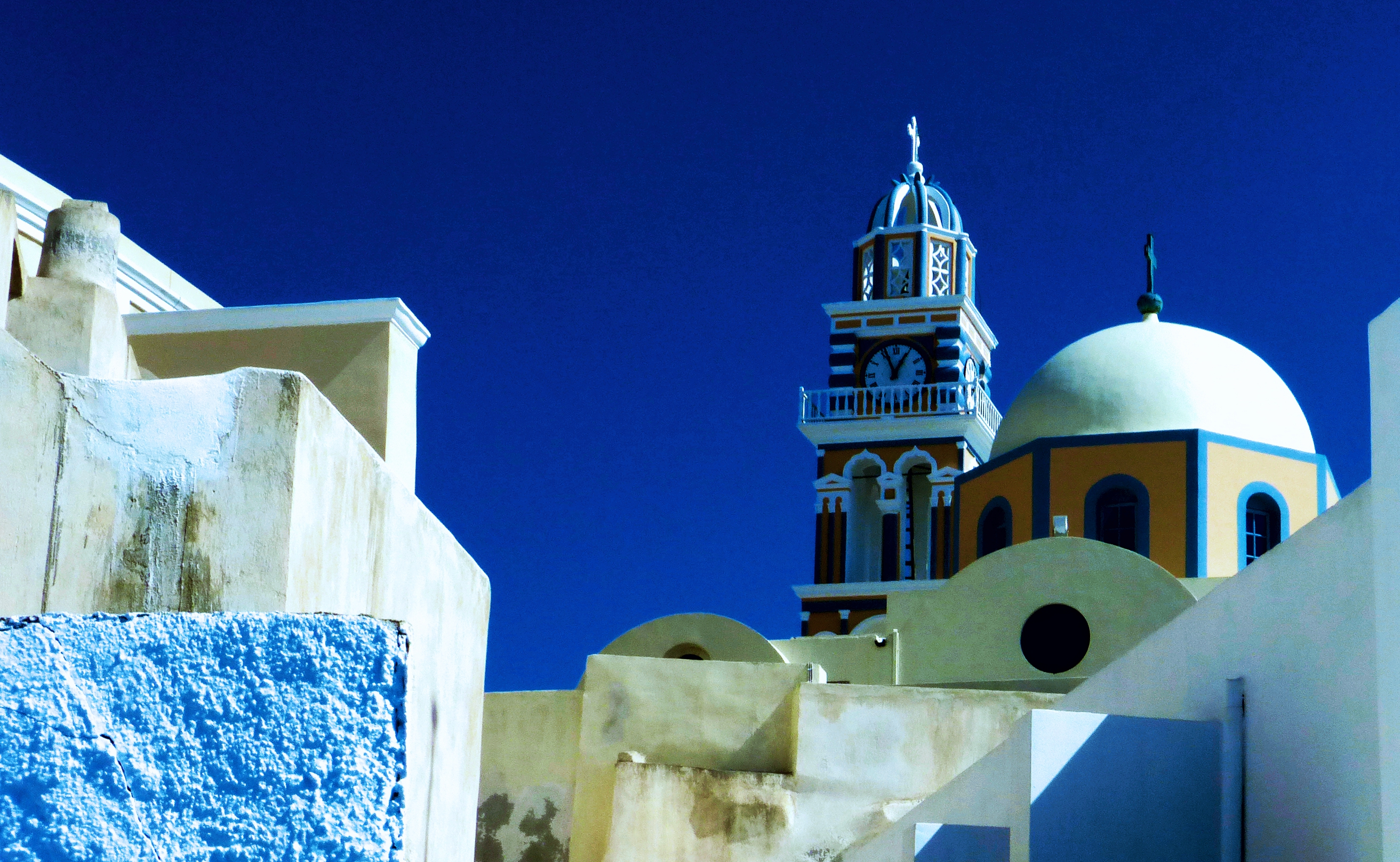
Image contrast increased

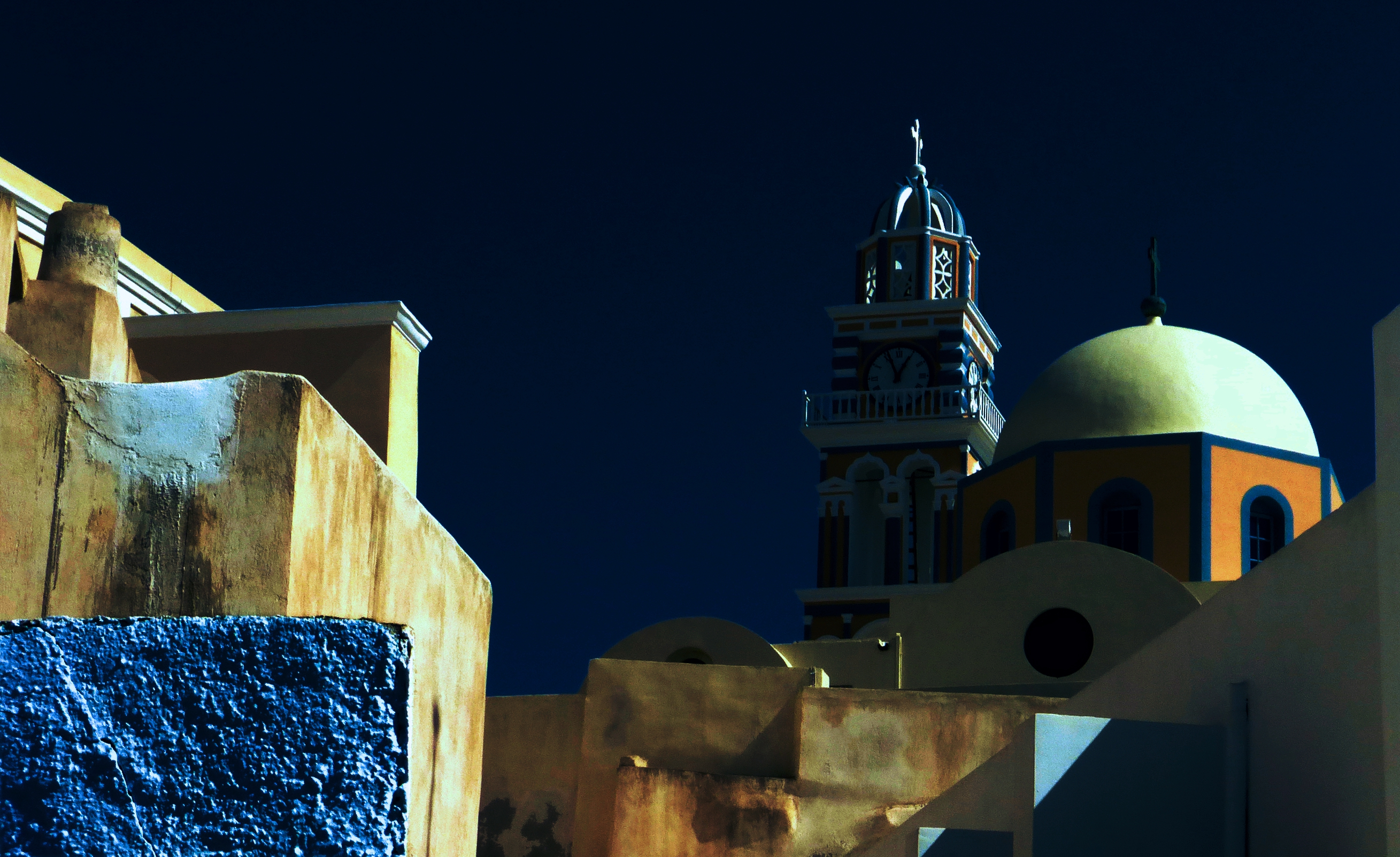
Exposure reduced two f-stops

With digital post-production techniques it is also common to add or intensify glare and light scattering from light sources that would otherwise be less pronounced in daylight, such as windows revealing indoor lighting, outdoor artificial lights, car headlights, and so on. Day for night techniques can be made more convincing through such digital effects. It is possible to digitally replace the entire sky to add the moon and stars, as was done for the film Cast Away. For the 2015 film Mad Max: Fury Road, an unusual variation of the technique was used, in which scenes were deliberately overexposed, rather than underexposed as is typically recommended. Taking advantage of the dynamic range of the digital cameras used on the production, the shots were then darkened and color-graded a bluish tint in post-production, with the result that detail was maintained in the shadows rather than being clipped, as might happen when underexposing.

Instead of shooting during midday, it is also common to shoot at dawn or dusk. During these periods, car headlights, streetlights, and interior lights are on, as they would be at night. This is sometimes referred to as "dusk for night." Shooting this way can be difficult because the desired lighting conditions last only a short time, during which both light levels and color temperatures are constantly changing.

In France, day for night is known as "la nuit américaine" (the American night) due to its common use in American films. The term is also the eponym of Francois Truffaut's film La Nuit américaine.

== In other media ==
A similar technique can sometimes be observed in older hand-tinted postcard views, where a "night" view of a scene is created by simply re-tinting the original (black and white) photo with darker coloration, suggestive of night.

Example of day and night scenes using the same photo:

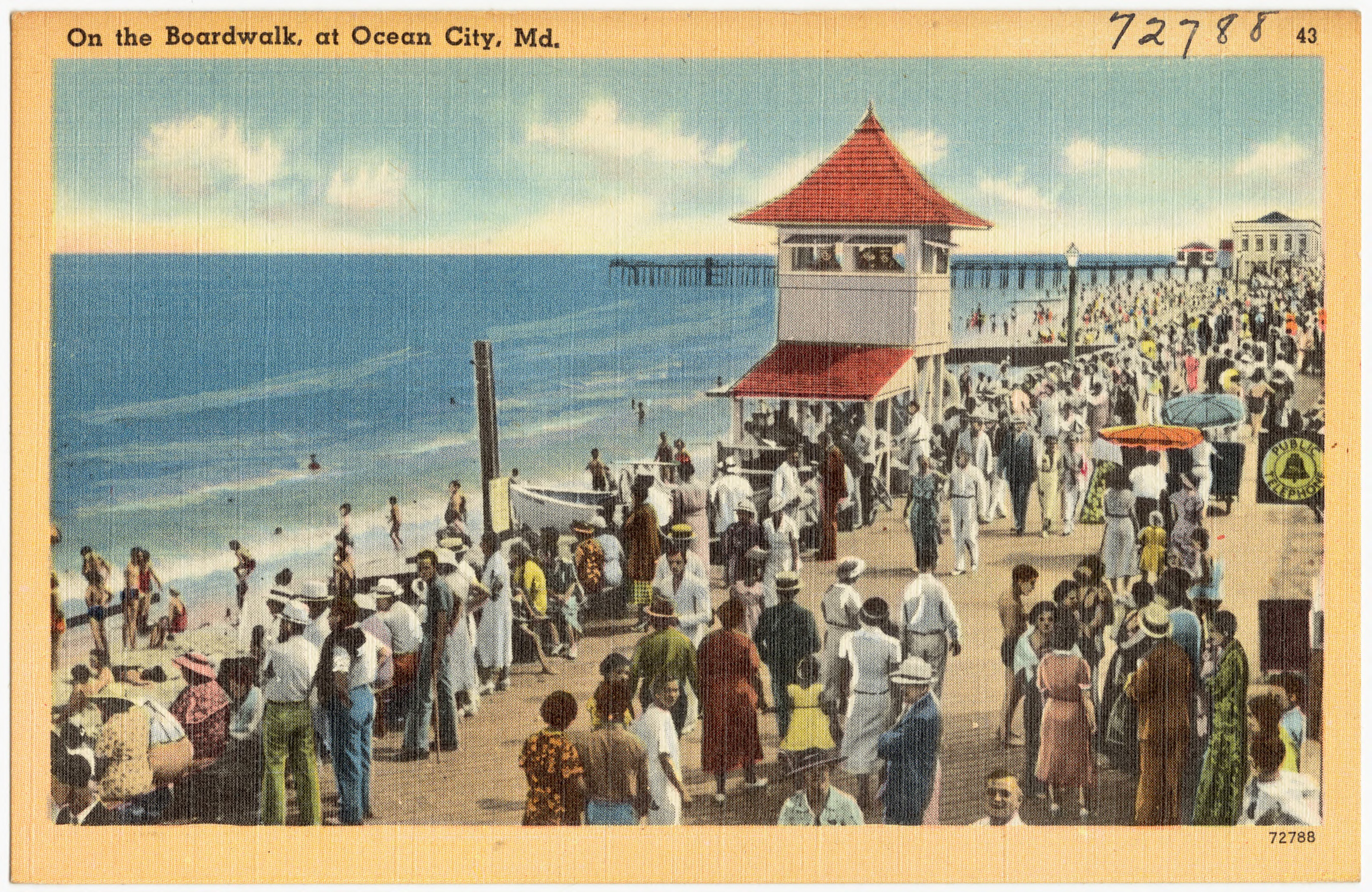
Original scene

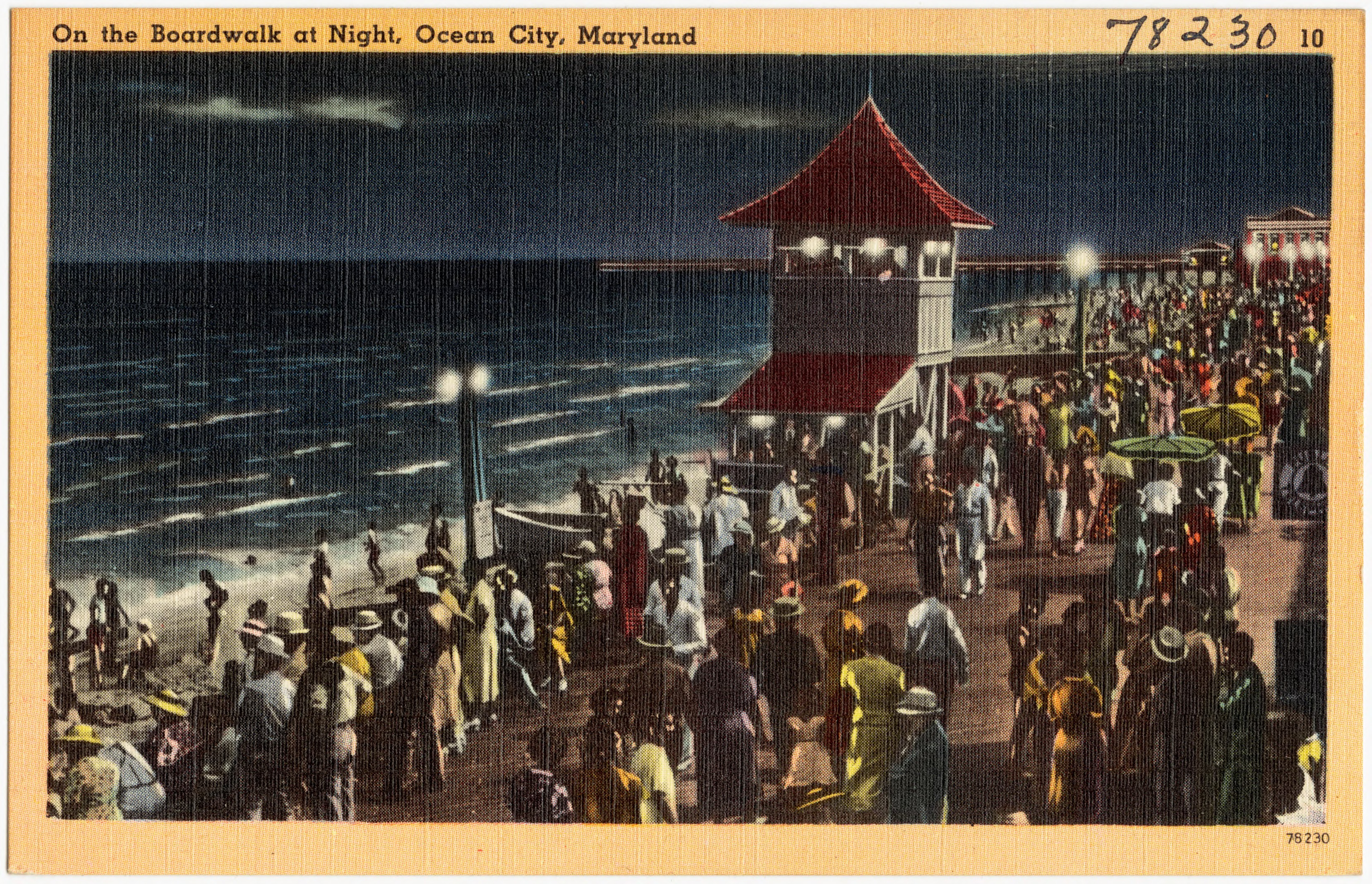
"Night" version

Though the results resemble day for night film and video shots, the techniques are quite different. Instead of reducing the exposure of the print made for the night version, the colorist painted an identical print with darker individual tints. No attempt at an overall bluish effect was made, and many colors are actually warmer in the "night" scene. (Compare the two beach umbrellas.) Convincing bright spots were added to the streetlights, which are unlit in the original, and the sky was supplied with fewer, wispier clouds.

== Night for day ==
A related technique is night for day, where an interior location is filmed at night but lit to simulate daylight, often by projecting large lights through windows.
