= Hollywood cycles =

In the classic era of the cinema of the United States (1930 – 1945) genres matured. A "cycle" occurs when a large amount of films consisting of specific features are produced in a certain period of time, and following the success of films with similar topics. While most would recognize many of the genres as Westerns, gangsters, musicals, etc., often the cycles were significantly more specific. A cycle is different from a genre or a subgenre, because a cycle focuses on a timeframe, while the other two can be used at different times. Hollywood studios created cycles to attract viewers in the 20th century, and succeed at the box office. Major Hollywood studios have made profits from film cycles because viewers are interested in films with the same theme or topic.

In the 1960s, successful examples of Hollywood cycles include cycles of youth revolution films, protest films, campus revolt films and youth rebellion films. However, in the 1980s, some films commercially failed, including Conan the Barbarian, The Thing and Footloose, because they did not meet the expectations.

Instead of "romantic comedy", a cycle might be described as the "Boy-meets-girl-boy-loses-girl-boy-gets-girl" cycle.

== See also ==
- Film theory
- Film genre
- Formula fiction In literary works, generic storylines are referred to as formula fiction.
- Trope
