= Lumapanel =

The Lumapanel is a motion picture light designed in the 1990s. It uses new-technology ballasts to drive 28 1-inch-diameter (25 mm) fluorescent bulbs resulting in a low-power, high-output computer-controlled fixture. It is used by various Hollywood cinematographers.

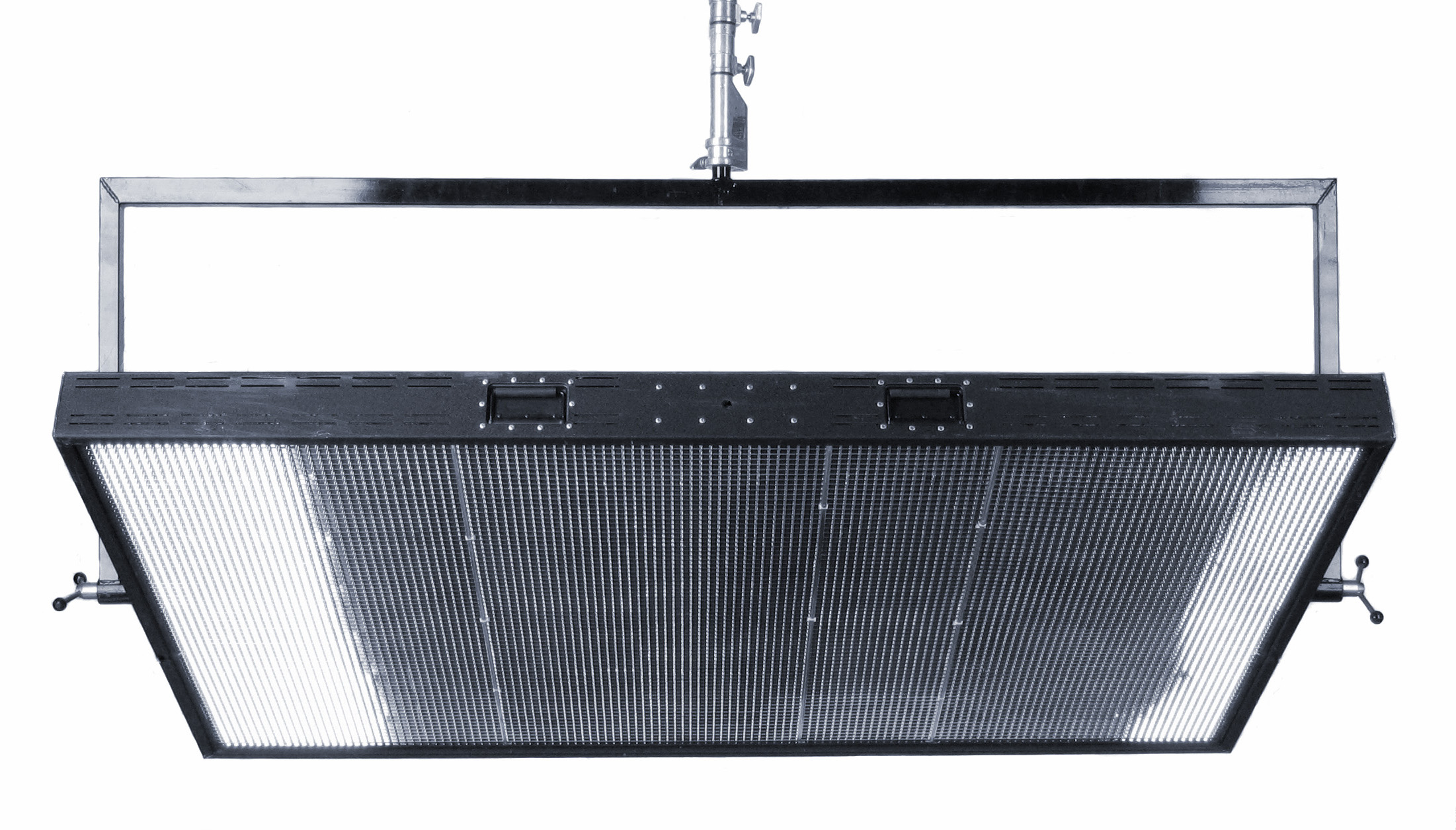
Lumapanel

== Projects ==
- Iron Man (2008)
- Pursuit of Happyness (2007)
- Smokin' Aces (2007)
- Live Free or DieHard (2007)
- Next (2007)
- Blades of Glory (2007)
- Freedom Writers (2006)
- RV (2006)
- You, Me and Dupree (2006)
- NEXT (2006)
- #23 (2006)
- Fast and Furious III (2006)
- Fun with Dick and Jane (2006)
- Smokin' Aces (2006)
- When a Stranger Calls (2006)
- Madonna (2005)
- War of the Worlds (2005)
- The Terminal (2004)
- Matchbox Twenty Concert Tour (2002)
- Catch Me If You Can (2002)
- Minority Report (2002)
- Artificial Intelligence: AI (2001)
- 98° Concert Tour (2000)
