= Oktoskop =

Oktoskop is a weekly TV show aired on Okto, a cable TV channel based in Vienna, Austria. The show focuses on Austrian and international alternative films and documentaries. An in-depth interview with the director of a film is followed by the film itself.
