= Lekolite =

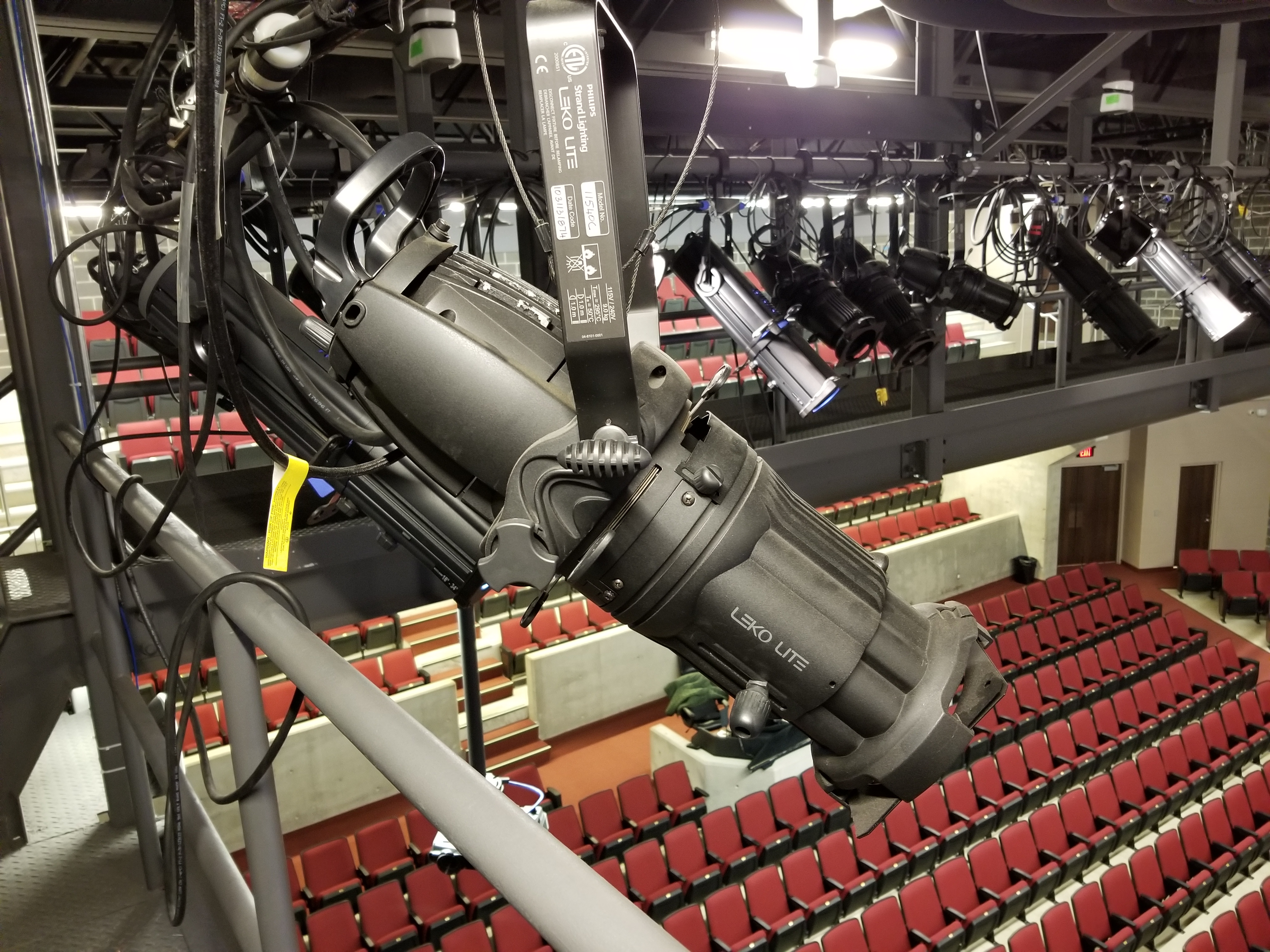

Fixture details
- Fixture type(s): ERS
- Rigging method(s): Yoke
- Lamp type(s): Halogen
- Colors(s): Black
- Pattern holder size(s): B
- Media frame size(s): 6.25", 12", 16"
- Automated: No

Production
- Inventor(s): Joseph Levy, Edward Kook
- First sold: 1933
- Manufacturer(s): Century Lighting, Strand Lighting Corporation
- Currently produced: No
- Website: https://www.vari-lite.com/global/products/leko-lite

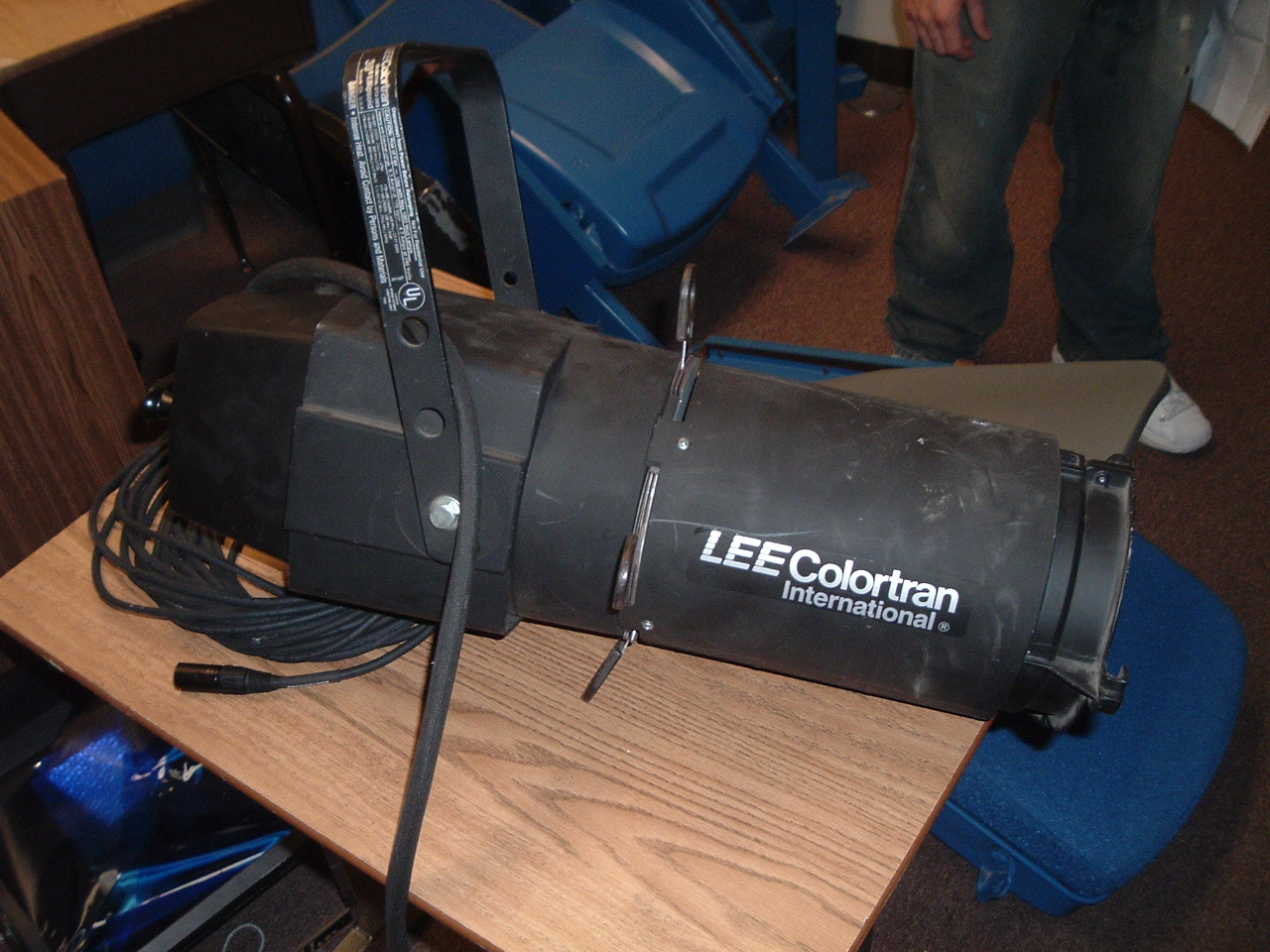
An ellipsoidal reflector spotlight

A Lekolite (often abbreviated to Leko) is a brand of ellipsoidal reflector spotlight (ERS) used in stage lighting which refers to the half-ellipsoidal dome reflector within which the instrument's lamp is housed. Introduced in 1933, it was developed by Joseph Levy and Edward Kook, founders of Century Lighting, which eventually became a part of the Strand Lighting Corporation. The instrument was widely used in theatre and entertainment venues into the 1990s, particularly in the United States. As other lighting technologies and products have taken the Lekolite's place, the term Leko has become a generic trademark (notably in North America, and among older folks in the industry) for all ERS fixtures.

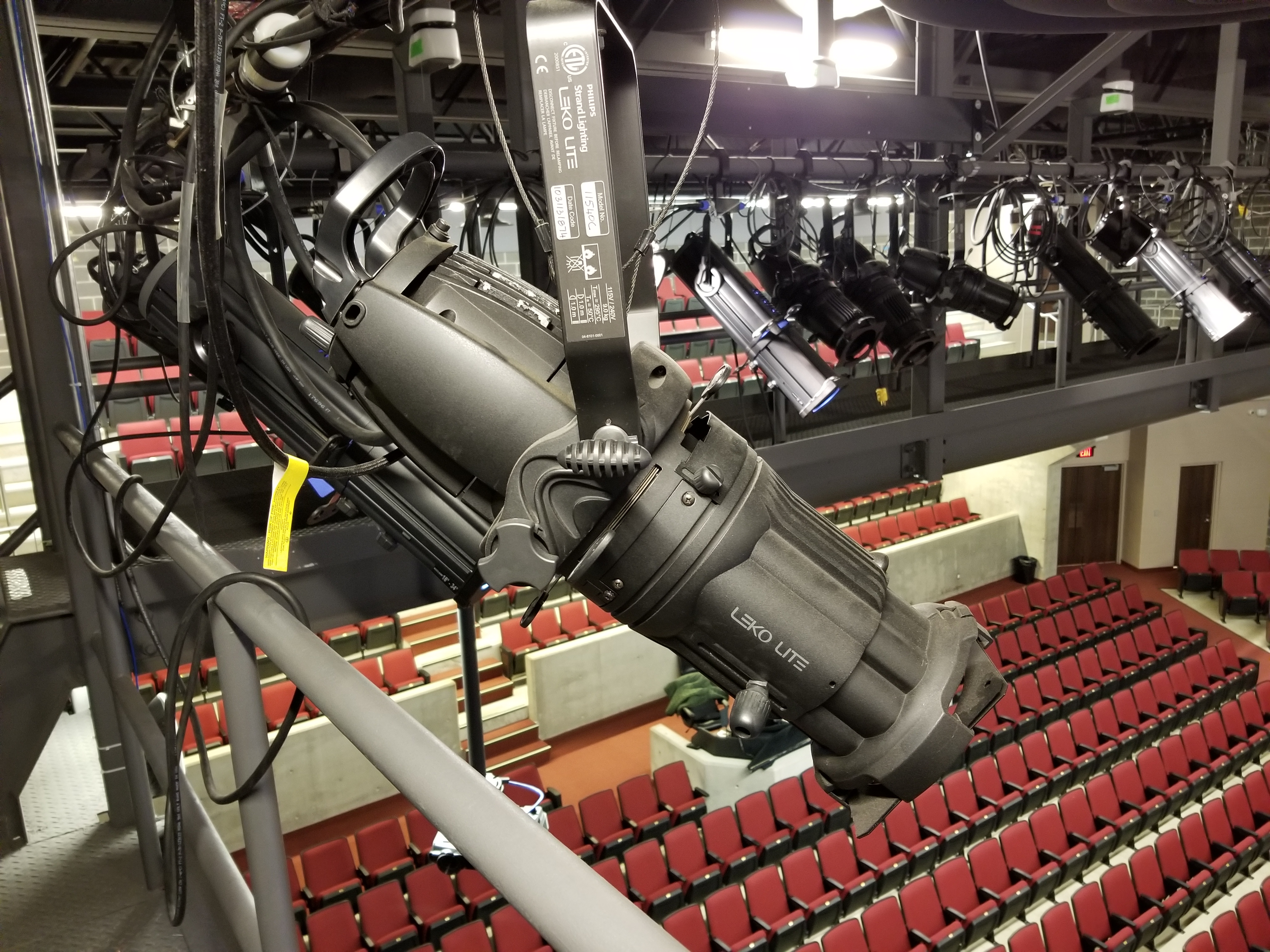
A Strand Lekolite

Century Lighting founders and the instrument's inventors, Joseph Levy and Edward Kook, combined the first two letters of their own last names and called the unit "Leko." Rival lighting company, Kliegl Brothers, released their own Elipsoidial Reflector Spotlight that same year, calling it "Klieglight". It is unclear which company was first to develop the new technology, but both had developed the technology earlier and had to wait until a lamp was developed by GE that would work in the new fixture. Strand lighting has begun to use the "Lekolite" name again.
