= Video assist =

System used in filmmaking

Video assist is a system used in filmmaking that allows filmmakers to view and distribute a video version of a take immediately after it is filmed. On set, the location where the assist is reviewed is called a video village.

== Usage ==
Originally developed to show the camera's view to more people than the one looking through the eyepiece, today video assist is the name of a complex system, consisting of monitors, recorders, video transmitters, video switchers, IT and RF equipment, and hundreds of yards of cables. The video assist crew—the video assist operator, assistant operator, cable guy and video trainee—are in charge of moving, plugging in cables, and troubleshoot. The whole system can easily fill a medium-sized truck. Their job is to set up the video village, consisting of the central video cart and accessories, and in the same or separate villages: director's monitors, producer's monitors, and sometimes DP's monitors (however that nowadays usually done by the DIT). Modern video assist is not only about signal reception and distribution, but recording, rough editing, visual effect previz and streaming.

All the camera connections coming into the video village go into the video trolley. On the cart are the video recorders, the most important equipment of a VA op. The cart usually holds a video matrix, for making quick interconnections, two small operator monitors, a powerful computer, an Uninterruptible Power Supply (UPS) and a collection of small tools. The camera images are fed to the larger monitors for the director, and sometimes for secondary arrays of monitors for the producers, clients, etc. More often than not the director and DP request a smaller, more private monitor set, and then the second array can be watched by everyone else. Hair, make-up, costume or Art Department members can watch streamed video on iPads. Off-set crew members like producers or clients from remote locations can watch and give notes/directions over video streams. On-board monitors, mounted directly on the camera, helps the focus puller to follow the shot.

== History ==
Comedian and director Jerry Lewis is widely credited with inventing the precursor to this system, although some similar systems existed before Lewis first used a video camera to simultaneously record scenes alongside his film camera during production of The Bellboy in 1960. Director Blake Edwards was the first to use the beam-splitter single-camera system invented by engineer Jim Songer in the 1968 film The Party.

== Video assist on film cameras ==
Originally a small device, called the Video tap, was installed inside a movie camera that allows (with the addition of a monitor) the director to see approximately the same view as the camera operator, and thus ensure that the film is being shot and framed as desired. This is done by using a small charge-coupled device (CCD) (similar to ones in consumer camcorders) inside the viewfinder. On modern film cameras, the assist is fed off a beam splitter, which splits the beam between the optical viewfinder and the video tap. The light enters through the lens, and hits the rotating mirror shutter, which bounces the light to the horizontal ground glass. The beam splitter is directly over the ground glass and turns the light again 90 degrees, and projects it onto the chip of the video assist camera—through its own lens system. The chip, together with its electronics, lens system and mounting hardware, is the video tap, and was commonly called video assist until the video assist industry grew large.

On steadicam and remote head or crane operation, the viewfinder and beam splitter is often removed because it's not needed. Then the full image is projected onto the video tap, making the image twice as bright, and hence better quality (lower noise). In these cases, even the camera operator uses a video monitor to operate the camera.

Though the quality of the film video assist feed can vary greatly based on both the camera and the assist, it is always used as a guide and nothing more. Because the assist has its own controls for exposure, contrast, focus and color correction, it is not possible to use it to learn anything more than the frame lines. The video assist camera is usually significantly lower in resolution than the film camera as well, so critical focus is still usually determined by distance from the lens to the subject via a tape measure.

After the revolution of the electronic HD cameras, film camera manufacturers added HD resolution video taps to their cameras.

== Video assist on electronic cameras ==
While the traditional video tap no longer applies to modern CCD based cameras, large-scale productions with HD cameras still use video assist in its wider meaning. In this case, the video signal is fed from the camera's own video output, and is a significantly better quality than the original video tap technology. HD cameras can output HD-SDI video signals, which, when presented on a high-grade calibrated monitor, is an almost what-you-see-is-what-you-get quality. Because the video cameras are often less tolerant of images with high contrast and quick light changes, and their behavior is harder to foresee than a film camera, DPs shooting HD cameras are often found in darkened tents, watching expensive HD monitors to make sure the image is captured correctly. This situation is getting better as newer cameras tend to simulate film gamma curves better.

== Other uses ==
While very simple video assist equipment is only capable of showing a live image, the modern VA equipment does much more than that. In the past, image feed from cameras were recorded onto an inexpensive medium (usually MiniDV or Hi8). Today hard disks are used. The VA software used by the operator keeps a precise log about which take was recorded where, noting the time code or file name. The operator then enters scene and take data, and then able to play back any shot in a short time, even right after the shot. This is essential for a director to show actors where to change their moves, or to recheck dialogue lines, check shooting angles, correct overlaps, and time camera or stunt actions. The VA recorder can usually simulate the under-cranking or over-cranking of the camera, and speed up or slow down the action. Ramps (speed changes in the shot) can be shown also.

== Continuity ==
Video Assist also helps the script supervisor and other departments with continuity requirements. By having all the recorded takes in the system, and often being supplied by cuts from the editors and previz videos from VFX dept, the VA operator can call up a continuity shot that was maybe shot weeks ago, but happens right before the current take in the movie. This helps costume to check how a garment was buttoned, make-up to check a fake scar's position, and helps the actors to exactly continue their previous actions. Using Video Assist can save expensive hours of post-production cleanups.

Nowadays movies often use more than one shooting units - parallel shooting crews working on separate parts of the same scenes. VA operators of the two units are in charge of moving video files between them, to reference the shoot units to each other. It is also often used so that the main unit director can check of the work done by the second unit. In modern systems, this sync can be done by automated software which takes care of copying the relevant files based on metadata.

== Editing and VFX ==
The video assist gear often includes an editing software, usually running on the same or a networked machine, so rough cuts can be made by the VA operator right on set.

A portable video mixer, or a similar function built right into the VA software, is useful to check out key, blends or pre-visualize visual effects. A more complex effect involving motion control or programmable remote heads can see the VA system sending or receiving triggers to such systems, to sync up live and playback images to show the director the effect in real time - for example when the same actor is playing more than one character.

== Streaming and remote shooting ==
Live streaming of the camera images has been around for a while, but it really took off during the 2020 Covid lockdowns. Film crews needed better ways of distancing, and to get rid of the group of people standing around monitors. Streaming to personal phones and tablets allows crewmembers to socially distance while still watch the camera feeds. After the borders were closed, crews had hard time to travel, and were looking for solutions. Streaming encrypted live feeds from shooting to decisionmakers' homes was one of them. Directors shooting pickup shots, Agency and Creatives watching commercial shootings can now participate without travelling overseas. Streaming usually originates from the Video Assist cart (they have both video from camera and audio from sound).
