= Butterfly (lighting) =

Structures used in cinematography

In cinematography, butterflies (also known as overheads) are large structures with a thin layer of a translucent material, such as cloth, that are placed over a scene to block the glare of direct sunlight. They can control the level of a sunlight in a scene, allowing consistent shadows over a full day of filming, or to make day seem cloudy when it is not. They also protect actors from direct sun.

Materials commonly used on butterflies include: flags (black, opaque materials), nets (layers of neutral-colored bobinette), and diffusions (translucent white materials of different densities) for the purposes of blocking, dimming, and scattering light respectively. In general, butterflies are used only for very large materials (6 ft x 6 ft or greater), while smaller sizes are usually sewn onto portable frames (similar in construction to picture frames) for ease of placement and storage.

== Use in industry ==
In industry, butterflies are often called for by their dimensions, which are standard: 6 ft. x 6 ft, 8x8, 12x12, and 20x20. The materials themselves tend to be created at smaller sizes—usually about 8 inches less in each dimension—so as order to ensure a flat, stretched surface when mounted on the butterfly.

While portable frames usually consist of light-blocking and scattering materials (flags, nets, and diffusions), butterflies may also be rigged with reflective materials such as silver lame for redirecting light.
