= Video tap =

A video tap is an accessory for a motion picture camera used in filmmaking to provide a video signal from the camera lens. Video taps are used to allow the film crew to see what is in the camera's frame without having to look through the viewfinder, as well as allowing video to be recorded and can be used to create an immediate rough cut, if needed. Since a video tap normally attaches to a camera's existing viewfinder using a beam splitter, the video appears dark and frame rate flicker is visible. Sometimes the tap will include frame lines and burned in timecode and keykode.

The person who operates a video tap is sometimes called a "video assist". Video taps can be useful for the director of a production to ensure the shot is to their liking, especially because, for example, 35mm film must be laboratory processed before it can be viewed. Most film cameras include a video tap.

== See also ==
- Video assist
