= Focus puller =

Occupation in filmmaking

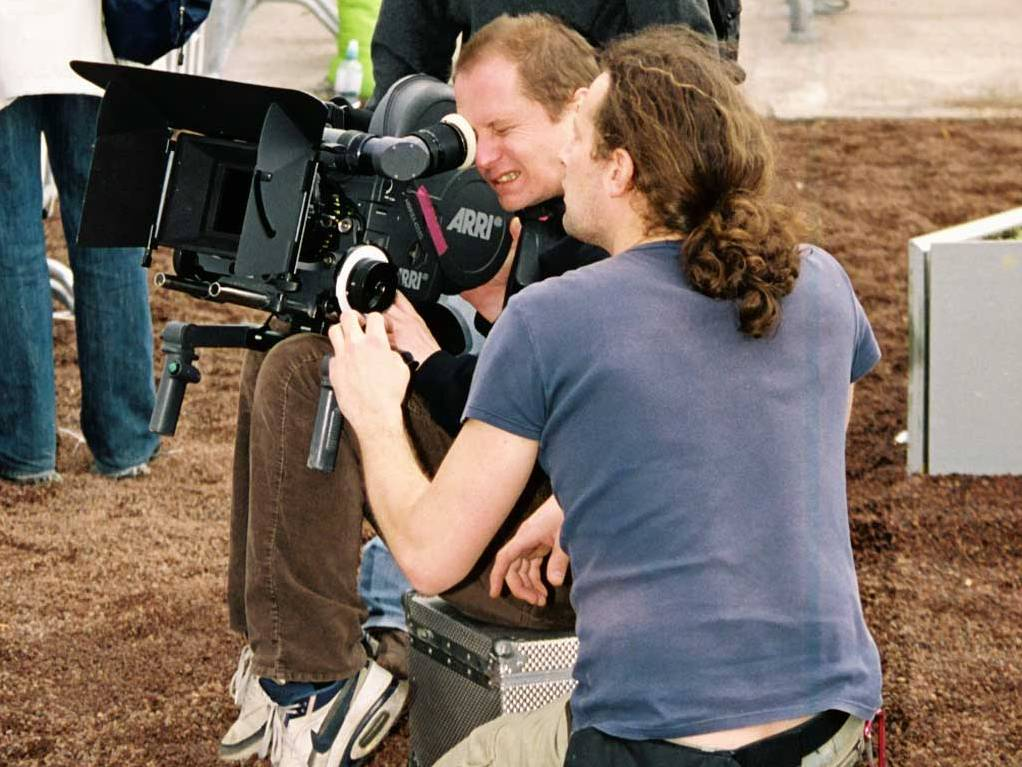
A focus puller

A focus puller or first assistant camera (1st AC) is a member of a film crew's camera department whose primary responsibility is to maintain the camera lens's optical focus on whatever subject or action is being filmed.

"Pulling focus" refers to the act of changing the camera lens's focus distance to a moving subject's distance from the focal plane, or the changing distance between a stationary object and a moving camera. For example, if an actor moves from 8 metres (26 ft) to 3 metres (9.8 ft) away from the focal plane, the focus puller changes the lens's distance setting in precise relation to the actor's changing position. The focus puller may also shift focus from one subject to another as the shot requires, a process called "rack focusing".

== Focus pulling ==
There is often very little room for error, depending on the parameters of a given shot. The focus puller's role is extremely important to a film production. In most circumstances, a "soft" image is considered unusable, as such an error can't be corrected in post-production— while it is possible to take detail out of a frame, any detail missed due to incorrect focus is lost. An actor may not be able to duplicate what was the best performance in a subsequent take, so the focus puller is expected to perform flawlessly every time.

British cinematographer Oliver Stapleton has written:

The 1st AC (or Focus Puller) has one of the hardest jobs on the set. And it's one of those jobs that are never noticed until it is wrong. Then you get an almighty bollocking, or you get fired ... Focus Pulling not only involves what it sounds like, but also the Focus Puller "runs" the department, in the sense of taking care of all the camera gear and making sure that everything is tickety-boo. I have my own camera, so it's treated very well! A focus puller relies heavily on the Operator to tell him if the shot is out of focus — after all only the operator is actually looking through the lens.

== Methodology ==
Once a camera position or overall "shot" is established by the director of photography and camera operator, the 1st AC begins to measure the various distances between the actors' marks and the focal plane of the camera. These distances are recorded in a series of grease pencil or pen marks on the focus barrel of the lens; similar marks may be placed on the marking disc or ring of any follow focus device being used. Traditionally, the focus puller used only their marks and their own well-developed sense of distance estimation to achieve good results. Over the last decade, the increased use of digital cameras, higher-resolution video taps, and on-camera monitors has provided focus pullers with additional tools to help maintain proper focus. A high-definition monitor can be particularly useful when a fast-paced production simply does not allow time for the focus puller to set and check all marks that may be needed, or if no rehearsal will be provided. In most modern-use cases, wireless video sender technology is employed to send a high definition or 4K signal directly to the focus puller.

The 1st AC may take surveying measurements of the general environment in order to have a good idea of the distances between reference points, such as patterns on the floor or walls, furniture, and whatever else might be around. These reference measurements can be used to quickly establish rough distances between the camera and the subject in chaotic shooting circumstances.

The 1st AC reports to the director of photography, works alongside the camera operator, and oversees the 2nd assistant camera (also known as the "clapper loader") and any other members of the camera department.
