= Scrim (lighting) =

Device used to modify properties of light

A scrim is a device used in the film and television industries, as well as by photographers, to modify properties of light. There are variations on types of scrim, depending upon its use, whether with natural light, or with man-made light sources. However, their basic use is the same – to reduce intensity and/or harshness of light.

In television, film, and theater lighting, a scrim is a material used to modify the properties of light. It can serve two primary functions:

Beam modification
placed in front of a light source (luminaire) to adjust the shape, intensity, or shadow characteristics of the beam. Variants such as half-scrims are designed to reduce the light on only a portion of the beam, often using a fine wire mesh.
Stage effects
employed as a curtain that appears opaque when illuminated from the front but becomes transparent when the front illumination is lowered and a stronger light is projected from behind, creating dramatic visual effects on stage.

== On lights ==
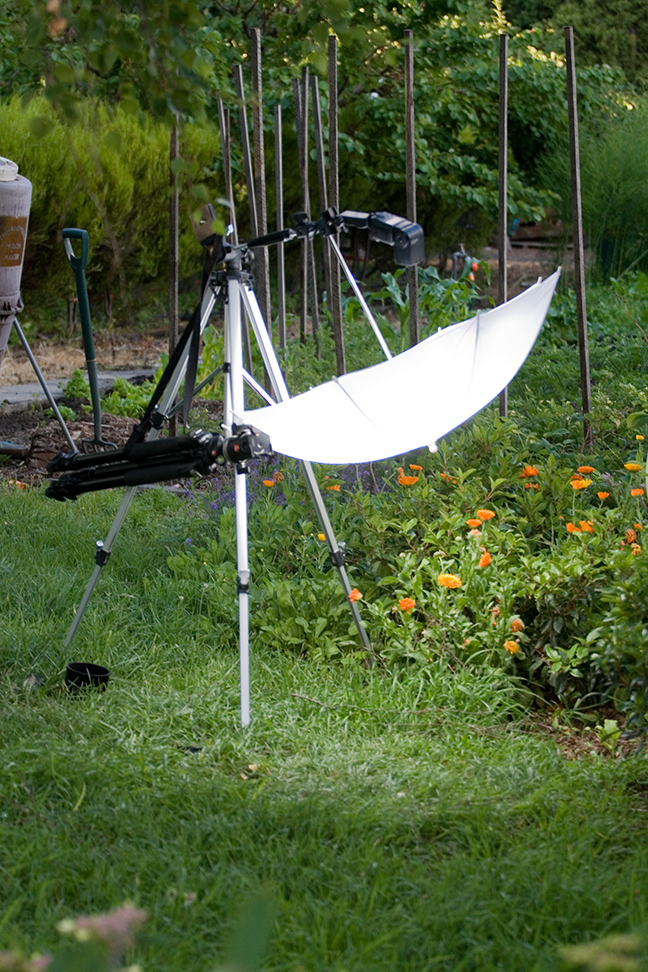
Flash through an umbrella scrim

Film and TV productions typically use constant lighting in the studio and on location. Some types of bulbs cannot be electrically dimmed because of their design, and incandescent bulbs will progressively change in colour temperature, becoming more orange, as they are dimmed.

Scrims in this context are considered to be a “colour safe” alternative to electrically dimming lights, and are a fine wire mesh available in different strengths, placed directly in front of the light.

=== Half and graduated scrims ===
A half scrim, as implied by its name, only has the mesh halfway across, which will allow the full intensity of light to fall on part of a scene. A graduated scrim varies the intensity of light from across it.

== Outdoors and photography ==
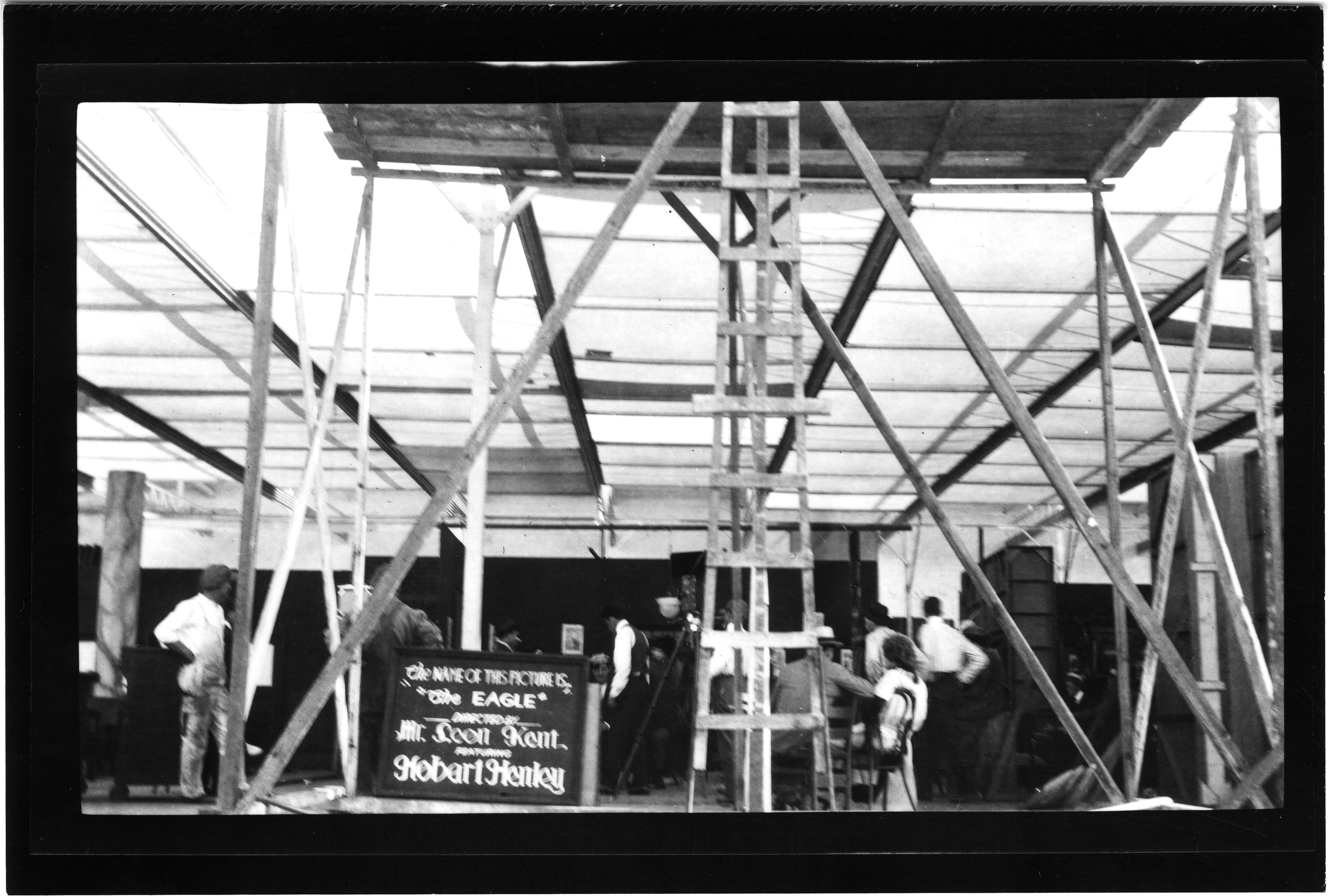
Overhead scrim on a natural-light film set, 1915

A scrim can also be a translucent gauze type material that may be fastened onto a frame, and used outdoors to reduce the intensity of, and soften harsh light on subjects/people being filmed or photographed. They are available in a multitude of shapes and sizes, either small enough to be held in one hand by a photographer or assistant, up to almost tent like contraptions.

In this context, a scrim can be used when harsh midday sun would otherwise cause people to squint, or “blown out” hotspots on people's skin, such as cheeks, foreheads and shoulders. The scrim is placed close to the subject, diffusing and reducing the intensity of light, which is much more flattering, especially for portraits.

A scrim can be used indoors on a soundstage. For example, a set may be built on a soundstage to include both the interior and exterior of a wall with a window, thereby enabling characters inside to see characters on what appears to be a patio or walkway outside. The portion of the set that appears to be "outside" may have to be brightly lit to simulate sunlight. A scrim is then attached to a frame overhanging the entire "outdoor" portion of the set between the lighting and the actors, in order to diffuse the light so that it appears more natural when it hits the actors' faces.

== Theatre ==
Scrims are also used as drapery in theatre and performance art. When lit from the front they appear as a solid piece of fabric. When lit from the rear they become semi transparent, creating a silhouette effect.

Scrims can be semi-transparent or wholly transparent depending on the fabric used and the lighting. They can be painted or not. They only create a 'silhouette effect' when designed to do so.

== See also ==
- Best boy
- Clothespin
- Dolly grip
- Film crew
- Flag
- Gaffer
- Gaffer tape
