= Beat (filmmaking) =

Timing and movement of a film or play

In filmmaking, a beat is a small amount of action resulting in a pause in dialogue. Beats usually involve physical gestures like a character walking to a window or removing their glasses and rubbing their eyes. Short passages of internal monologue can also be considered a sort of internal beat. Beats are also known as "stage business".

A beat sheet is a short list of the pivotal actions and emotional turning points in a story.

== Beats as pacing elements ==
Beats are specific, measured, and spaced to create a pace that moves the progress of the story forward. Audiences feel uneven or erratic beats. Uneven beats are the most forgettable or sometimes tedious parts of a film. Erratic beats jolt the audience unnecessarily. Every cinematic genre has a beat that is specific to its development. Action film has significantly more beats (usually events); drama has fewer beats (usually protagonist decisions or discovery). Between each beat a sequence occurs. This sequence is often a series of scenes that relates to the last beat and leads up to the next beat.

Following is a beat example from The Shawshank Redemption:

- At 25 minutes: Andy talks to Red and asks for rock hammer. - Decision
- At 30 minutes: Andy gets rock hammer. - Event
- At 35 minutes: Andy risks his life to offer financial advice to Mr. Hadley. - Decision
- At 40 minutes: Andy notes ease of carving his name in the wall. - Discovery

After each beat listed above, a significant series of results takes place in the form of the sequence, but what most people remember are the beats, the moment something takes place with the protagonist.

== See also ==
- Unit of action, in acting
