= Glossary of motion picture terms =

This glossary of motion picture terms is a list of definitions of terms and concepts related to motion pictures, filmmaking, cinematography, and the film industry in general.

== 0–9 ==
180-degree rule
A basic guideline regarding the on-screen spatial relationship between a character and another character or object within a scene. By keeping the camera on one side of an imaginary axis between two characters, the first character is always frame right of the second character. Moving the camera over the axis is called jumping the line or crossing the line; breaking the 180-degree rule by shooting on all sides is known as shooting in the round.
30-degree rule
A basic film editing guideline that states the camera should move at least 30 degrees relative to the subject between successive shots of the same subject. If the camera moves less than 30 degrees, the transition between shots may look like a jump cut, which could jar the audience and take them out of the story by causing them to focus on the film technique rather than the narrative itself.
3D film

A type of motion picture that utilizes special filming techniques to create the illusion of depth perception, hence adding a third dimension.

== A ==
A roll
Abby
"The Abby" is the second-to-last shot. Named after assistant director, Abner E "Abby" Singer, who called out the shot to give the crew extra time to prepare for a company move or wrap.
above-the-line
The list of individuals who guide and influence the creative direction, process, and voice of a given narrative in a film and related expenditures. These roles include but are not limited to the screenwriter, producer, director, and actors. Contrast below-the-line.
accelerated montage
accent light
acousmatic
Sound that is heard without an originating cause being seen.
action axis
actor

Any person, male or female, who portrays a character in a performance.
adaptation
The transfer of a creative work or story, fiction or nonfiction, whole or in part, to a motion picture format; i.e. the reimagining or rewriting of an originally non-film work with the specific intention of presenting it in the form of a film.
aerial perspective
aerial shot
alternate ending
ambient light

Any source of light that is not explicitly supplied by the cinematographer. The term usually refers to sources of light that are already "available" naturally (e.g. the Sun, Moon, lightning) or artificial light that is already being used (e.g. to light a room).
American night
American shot

A translation of a phrase from French film criticism, plan américain, which refers to a medium-long ("knee") film shot of a group of characters, who are arranged so that all are visible to the camera. The usual arrangement is for the actors to stand in an irregular line from one side of the screen to the other, with the actors at the end coming forward a little and standing more in profile than the others. The purpose of the composition is to allow complex dialogue scenes to be played out without changes in camera position.
anamorphic format
1. The technique of shooting a widescreen picture on visual recording media with a non-widescreen native aspect ratio.
2. A projection format in which a distorted image is "stretched" by an anamorphic projection lens to recreate the original aspect ratio on the viewing screen.
anamorphic widescreen
angle of light
angle of view
angle plus angle
angular resolution
animation
animatronics
answer print
The first version of a given motion picture that is printed to film after color correction on an interpositive. It is also the first version of the movie printed to film with the sound properly synced to the picture.
aperture
apple box
Armorer
A member of the shooting crew who handles, maintains, and is responsible for real and prop weapon safety on set.
art department
artificial light
ASA speed rating
aspect ratio
autofocus
automated dialogue replacement

The process of re-recording dialogue by the original actor after the filming process to improve audio quality or reflect dialogue changes. In India the process is simply known as "dubbing", while in the UK, it is also called "post-synchronisation" or "post-sync". The insertion of voice acting performances for animation, such as computer-generated imagery or animated cartoons, is often referred to as ADR, although it generally does not replace existing dialogue.
available light
See ambient light.
axial cut
A type of jump cut, where the camera suddenly moves closer to or further away from its subject along an invisible line drawn straight between the camera and the subject. While a plain jump cut typically involves a temporal discontinuity (an apparent jump in time), an axial cut is a way of maintaining the illusion of continuity. Axial cuts are used rarely in contemporary cinema but were fairly common in the cinema of the 1910s and 1920s.

== B ==
B movie
B-roll
baby plates
backlighting
backlot
background actor
See extra.
background lighting
balloon light
barn doors
beatscript
below-the-line
A term derived from the top sheet of a film budget for motion pictures, television programs, industrial films, independent films, student films and documentaries as well as commercials. The "line" in "below-the-line" refers to the separation of production costs between script and story writers, producers, directors, actors and casting (collectively referred to as "above-the-line") and the rest of the film crew or production team.
best boy

In a film crew, an assistant to either of two department heads: the gaffer or the key grip (with the assistant sometimes referred to as the best boy electric or best boy grip, respectively). The best boy acts as the foreman for his department.
billing
bird's eye shot
blocking
The precise staging of actors in a way that facilitates the performance in a film.
bluescreen
boom shot
boomerang
bounce board
breaking down the script
breathing
bridging shot
brightness (lighting)
broad light
broadside (lighting)
buffer shot

A film technique of inserting a shot into a film to disguise a mistake, or a cut. For example, if Character A is talking to Character B and the microphone is briefly in shot while Character A is talking, the editor could insert a shot of Character B listening or reacting, to cover up the mistake. This technique is often used in news reporting when there is no opportunity for re-takes, or to cover up cuts in an interview.
bullet time
butterfly

== C ==
C-clamp
call time
The time at which the crew is expected to be on set for work.
Callier effect
cameo appearance
cameo lighting
A type of lighting whereby a spotlight accentuates a single character or other subject and sometimes a few props in a scene, so that the focus of the scene is on the subject and not its surrounding environment. It is often used to create an "angelic" shot, such as one where a light used to represent God or heaven shines down onto the character. Cameo lighting derives its name from the art form in which a light relief figure is set against a darker background. It is often achieved by using barn-doored spotlights. A problem with cameo lighting is that it can lead to color distortion and noise in the darkest areas.
camera angle
The specific location and position from which a movie camera or video camera is oriented to take a shot. A single scene may be shot from several camera angles simultaneously.
camera boom
camera crane
camera coverage
camera dolly
A wheeled cart or similar apparatus to which a camera is mounted so that the camera can be moved horizontally in order to capture smooth, natural motion shots. Often but not necessarily operated upon a set of rails or a track, a dolly is generally used to produce images which involve the camera moving toward or away from a subject, or panning across a scene from side to side. A dolly grip may be responsible for manually pushing the dolly back and forth.
camera operator

A member of a film crew who operates a film camera or digital video camera.
camera solving
See match moving.
camera stabilizer
Any device designed to hold a camera in a manner that prevents or compensates for unwanted camera movement, such as "camera shake".
candles per square foot
casting
The pre-production process by which individual actors, extras, or other performers are selected for particular roles or parts in a screenplay or script, often but not always following auditions held for certain roles or parts.
casting director
Century stand

A metal stand primarily used to position light modifiers such as silks, nets, or flags in front of light sources.
character actor
An actor who specializes in or is often cast in supporting roles as unusual, interesting, eccentric, or otherwise distinctive characters, particularly those that highlight the actor's range and versatility or that permit them the freedom to develop or stylize the character in their own unique way.
character animation
choker shot
chroma keying

A post-production visual effects technique for compositing or layering two images or video streams together based on color hues: a specific range of color(s) in the background of the first shot is made transparent, allowing separately recorded footage or a static image to be displayed in the transparent areas instead, giving the appearance that the foreground subject of the first shot is in front of a particular background environment. Chroma keying can be done with any color from the first shot that is uniform and distinct from the colors of the intended foreground subject, but green and blue are commonly used because the subject is often a human and these differ most distinctly in hue from human skin colors.
chromatic aberration
CinemaDNG
Cine lens
cinematographer
cinematography
The science or art of motion-picture photography by recording light or other electromagnetic radiation, either electronically by means of an image sensor or chemically by means of a light-sensitive material such as film stock.
clapperboard
A device used in filmmaking and video production to assist in the synchronizing of picture and sound, and to identify and mark the various scenes and takes as they are filmed and audio-recorded. Use of a clapperboard can make editing and arranging film sequences easier during post-production.

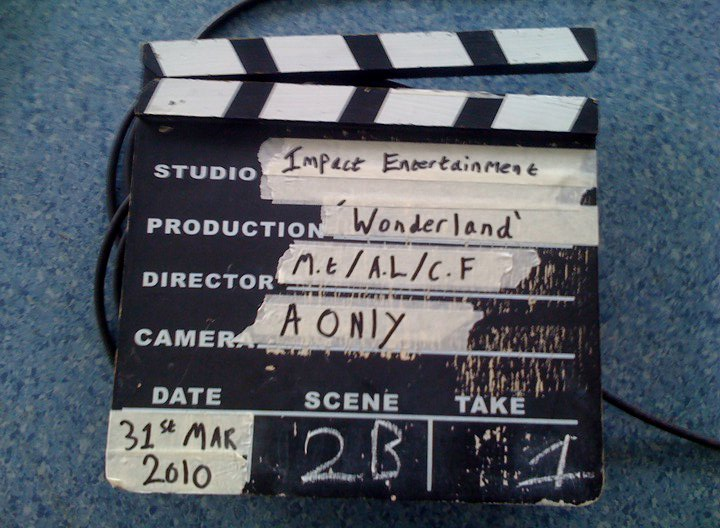
A traditional wooden slate clapperboard on set

clock wipe
close shot
close-up

closing credits
cold open
A narrative technique in which a film or television program begins by immediately showing scenes from the story, before the title sequence or opening credits are shown.
color conversion filter
color corrected fluorescent light
color correction
The process of using filters, color gels, or computer software to alter the overall color of the light in a scene.
color gel
color grading
color rendering index
color reversal internegative
color temperature
color timer
colorization
The practice of adding color to black-and-white, sepia, or other monochrome film or still images, either as a special effect, to "modernize" films made in the pre-color era, or to restore or remaster dated color films; or any process by which this effect is achieved. Modern colorization is usually achieved with digital image processing software.
compositing
The process or technique of combining visual elements from separate sources into a single image, particularly so as to create the illusion that all of those elements are parts of the same scene. In modern cinema, compositing is usually achieved through digital image manipulation in post-production.
continuity
The consistency of the characteristics of people, objects, places, and plot as understood from the perspective of the viewer of a motion picture.
continuity editing
continuity error
A mistake in the apparent continuity of a motion picture or its script as it is presented to and understood by the audience; e.g. an object in a scene that is present in one shot subsequently being absent or in a different position in the next shot, without any obvious explanation given as to how or why the object might have moved. Continuity errors are often the result of shots or scenes which are ultimately presented consecutively in the finished film being filmed out of sequence or under different shooting conditions during production, such that the natural continuity intended in the scenes is lost and must instead be simulated by the filmmaker.
Cooke triplet
cost report
craft services
A department in film and television production which provides the cast and crew with snacks, drinks, and other assistance during a film shoot.
crane shot
creative geography
creature suit
A realistic costume used to disguise a performer as an animal, monster, or other being, often covering the entire body and head.
cross-cutting
cross lighting
cucoloris
A device through which light from a man-made source is filtered in order to produce patterned illumination of a scene or shot by casting shadows or silhouettes or otherwise scattering the light, often with the intention of achieving a more natural look or simulating certain aspects of a setting, e.g. passing shadows.
cutaway
cut
An abrupt but usually trivial transition from one shot or sequence to another, consisting simply of the sudden termination of the first shot and the immediate beginning of the next, without any delay or interspersed effects. The term originally referred to the physical cutting of a film strip and the subsequent splicing together of non-adjacent frames, but is now also used to refer to a similar process in computer editing software. It is often used interchangeably with the term edit, though edit may also imply any number of transitions or effects.
cut in
cut out
cutting on action

A film editing and video editing technique where the editor cuts from one shot to another that matches the first shot's action.

== D ==
dailies
The raw, unedited footage shot during the making of a motion picture, traditionally the first positive prints developed from the negatives filmed on the previous day, in a process that in the era of physical film reels took place overnight. The dailies were typically reviewed by the director and other cast and crew members the next day. With the advent of digital filmmaking, dailies became available instantly after each take and the review process was no longer tied to the overnight development of film.
daily call sheet
The schedule crafted by the assistant director, using the director's shot list. It is issued to the cast and crew of a film production to inform them of when and where they should report for a particular day of filming. The production schedule is usually listed by call time, the time when people are expected to start work on a film set.
daily editor log
daily production report
daily progress report
day for night
A set of cinematic techniques used to simulate a nighttime scene while filming in daylight, often employed when it is too difficult or expensive to actually shoot during nighttime. When shooting day for night, the otherwise bright daytime footage is typically underexposed in-camera or artificially darkened during post-production, often with a blue tint added; additional effects may also be used to give the impression of genuine darkness.
Day Out of Days
A chart used by filmmakers to tally the number of paid days for each cast member.
day player
deadspot (lighting)
deep focus
delayed release
depth of field
depth of focus
dialect coach
An acting coach who helps an actor design and rehearse the voice and speech of a character in a film, television, stage, radio, or voiceover production.
dialogue editor
dichroic lens
diegetic sound
diffraction
digital audio
1. A representation of sound recorded in, or converted into, digital form, in which the sound waves of the audio signal are typically encoded as numerical samples in a continuous sequence.
2. The entire technology of sound recording and reproduction using audio signals that have been encoded in digital form.
digital cinema
digital cinematography
The process of recording a motion picture using digital image sensors rather than physical film stock. Almost all modern films are both recorded and distributed digitally.
digital compositing
The process of digitally assembling (i.e. with computer software) multiple independently recorded images to create a final composite image, typically during post-production.
digital film
digital image processing
digital intermediate
digital negative
Digital Picture Exchange
digital projection
dimmer (lighting)
direct lighting
director
dissolve
distribution
The process of making a motion picture available for viewing by an audience, typically by exhibiting it directly to the public through a movie theater or a television broadcast, or by printing and selling copies for personal home viewing. For commercial projects, film distribution is usually accompanied by marketing and promotion.
DMX (lighting)
documentary film

A type of non-fiction motion picture intended to document some aspect of reality, primarily for the purposes of instruction, education, or maintaining a historical record.
dolly grip
dolly shot
dolly zoom
double-system recording
A type of sound recording in which the sound for a scene is recorded on to a machine that is separate from the camera or picture-recording apparatus; hence the recorded images and sounds are recorded simultaneously but independently on to separate storage media.
douser (lighting)
drawn on film animation
dubbing
dump months
Dutch angle

A type of camera shot where the camera is set at an angle on its roll axis so that the shot is composed with vertical lines at an angle to the side of the frame, or, equivalently, so that the horizon line of the shot is not parallel with the bottom of the camera frame. This produces a viewpoint akin to tilting one's head to the side. In cinematography, the Dutch angle is one of many cinematic techniques used to portray psychological uneasiness or tension in the subject being filmed.
dynamic composition

== E ==
edit decision list
editing
effects light
electrotachyscope
ellipsoidal reflector spot light
establishing shot
Any shot which sets up or establishes the context for a scene by showing the relationship between its important figures and objects. It is often a long or extreme long shot at the beginning of a scene indicating where, and sometimes when, the remainder of the scene takes place.
executive producer
external rhythm

The sense of movement or "flow" established by the duration of the shots (and consequently the frequency of cuts) that comprise a scene or sequence. Lengthening or shortening the duration of the shots establishes an often subconscious rhythmic pattern that may complement or contrast with the internal rhythm and content of a scene or sequence.
extra

An actor or performer in a film who appears in a non-speaking or non-singing capacity, usually briefly and in the background, without any particular characterization or direct plot relevance, such that viewers are not intended to identify with or consciously focus on the character at all. Extras are often employed in large numbers in war films or epic films, or in scenes depicting crowded city streets, with the sole purpose of creating a sense of scale by populating the scene with activity. They generally have the most minimal roles of any persons considered cast members, and though they are usually required to be paid, they are sometimes not even trained actors.
extreme close-up
extreme long shot
eye-level camera angle
eyeline match

== F ==
F-number
F-stop
fade-in
fade-out
fast cutting
fast motion
See time-lapse.
feature film

A narrative film with a running time long enough for it to be considered the principal or feature presentation in a commercial entertainment program. The term originally referred to the main, full-length film in early cinema programs that also included one or more short films, newsreels, or advertisements presented before the main event. In modern usage the term more commonly indicates simply that a film is of a substantial length or running time, as distinguished from short films, though what is considered "feature length" can vary and has changed over time.
feature length
The minimum running time necessary to be considered a full-length or feature film, as opposed to a short film. Most films between 75 and 210 minutes in duration are said to be feature-length, but the precise definition can vary.
field of view
fill light
One of three sources of light in a traditional three-point lighting set-up, generally placed to one side of the subject being filmed or photographed, opposite the back light and approximately perpendicular to the key light. The fill light is often used to reduce the contrast of a scene in order to match on the recording media the level of detail typically seen by the human eye in real-world lighting conditions.
film
film budgeting
film crew
The collective term for a group of people hired by a film production company for the purpose of producing a film or motion picture. The crew is distinguished from the cast, which is generally understood to consist solely of the actors who appear in front of the camera or provide voices for characters in the film, as well as from the producers, who own at least a portion of the production company or the film's intellectual property rights.
film criticism
film finance
film gate
The rectangular opening in the front of a motion picture camera through which the film is exposed to light. It can be seen by removing the lens and rotating the shutter out of the way. A pressure plate behind the film holds the film on a uniform plane at a calibrated distance from the gate.
film genre
film inventory report
film modification
film plane
The surface inside a camera upon which the lens creates a focused image. Each lens used with the camera must be calibrated carefully to ensure that the image is focused on the exact spot where the individual frame of film or digital sensor is positioned during exposure.
film production
film recorder
film release
film scanner
film score
A piece of original music written specifically to accompany a film. A score is typically divided into a number of orchestral, instrumental, or choral pieces called cues, which are timed to begin and end at specific points during the film in order to enhance the dramatic narrative and the emotional impact of particular scenes.
film speed
film stock
An analog recording medium for motion pictures that is recorded on by a movie camera, developed, edited, and then projected on to a screen by a projector. Film stock consists of a long strip of transparent plastic film base coated on one side with a gelatin emulsion containing microscopic light-sensitive silver halide crystals. When briefly exposed to the light admitted by a camera lens, a subtle chemical change occurs that is proportional to the amount of light absorbed by each crystal, creating an invisible latent image in the emulsion which can then be developed through further chemical treatment into a visible photograph. Film stock made of nitrate, acetate, or polyester bases is the traditional medium for capturing the numerous frames of a motion picture, widely used until the emergence of digital film in the late 20th century.
film theory
film transition
film treatment
filmmaking

The process of making a film or motion picture, generally in the sense of a film intended for extensive theatrical exhibition. Filmmaking typically involves a large number of people and takes from a few months to several years to complete.
filmography
A list of motion pictures related by some criteria, e.g. the list of films a certain actor has appeared in, or that a certain director has directed.
filter
fine cut
fisheye lens
flashback
flashforward
flicker fusion threshold
floodlight
focal length
focus
focus puller
Foley artist
follow focus
follow shot
followspot light
forced perspective
A technique which employs optical illusion to make an object appear farther away, nearer, larger or smaller than it actually is. It manipulates human visual perception and exploits sensory biases through the use of scaled objects and the correlation between them and the vantage point of the observer or camera.
footage
1. Any raw, unedited material filmed by a movie or video camera, as opposed to that which has been edited to produce a completed work such as a motion picture or television show.
2. The amount of film shot or material recorded during a particular period of time or during the making of a particular scene or feature, referring especially to the physical length of the recorded film strip, which was traditionally measured in feet. One foot of standard 35mm film contains 16 frames, and a standard recording speed is 24 frames per second, or 1.5 feet per second; a 90-minute feature film shot in this way on conventional film stock is therefore equivalent to more than a mile and a half of footage.
found footage (film technique)
fourth wall
frame
One of a series of numerous still images which, when viewed rapidly in sequence, compose a motion picture. Each frame is typically only shown to the viewer for a fraction of a second, and the number of frames viewed every second is known as the frame rate.
frame composition
frame rate

The rate or frequency at which the consecutive still images of a motion picture, known as frames, are captured or played back, typically expressed in frames per second (fps) or hertz (Hz).
freeze frame shot
French hours
A production method to save time by denying crew a break or sit down lunch, eating if or when possible.
Fresnel lens
full frame

The use of the full film gate at maximum width and height for 35mm film cameras.
full shot
See wide shot.

== G ==
gobo
An object placed inside or in front of a light source to control the shape of the emitted light and its shadow.
go motion
A type of stop-motion animation which attempts to simulate motion blur in each frame involving motion. Ordinary stop-motion animation can result in a disorienting "staccato" effect because the animated object has a perfectly sharp appearance in every frame (since each frame was actually shot when the object was perfectly still); by contrast, objects that are actually moving will appear slightly blurry, because they moved while the shutter of the camera was open. Go motion attempts to recreate this blur effect so that the animation appears more natural, as if the animated object was actually moving in each frame.
Godspot effect
green-light
grip
gaffer

== H ==
hanging miniature
hard light
head-on shot
head shot
heart wipe
high-angle shot
A cinematic technique where the camera looks down on the subject from a high angle and the point of focus often gets "swallowed up." High-angle shots can make the subject seem vulnerable or powerless when applied with the correct mood, setting, and effects. In film, they can make the scene more dramatic. If there is a person at high elevation who is talking to someone below them, this shot is often used.
high concept
An artistic work that can be easily pitched to a producer because it can be readily summarized with a few key ideas or with a succinctly stated premise. Contrast low concept.
high-intensity discharge lamp
high-key lighting
A style of lighting that aims to reduce the lighting ratio present in the scene being filmed, particularly by creating a more balanced ratio between the key light and the fill light in a traditional three-point set-up. High-key lighting is usually rather homogeneous and free from dark shadows, and therefore is commonly used to suggest an upbeat mood, especially in sitcoms and comedies.
hip hop montage
honeywagon
Mobile bathrooms on a trailer
hook
Hydrargyrum Medium-Arc Iodide lamp

== I ==
independent film
insert
internal rhythm
interpositive (IP)

An orange-based motion picture film with a positive image made from the edited camera negative. The orange base provides special color characteristics that allow for more accurate color reproduction than a clear base, as used in an exhibition positive.
intertitle

A piece of filmed, printed text edited into the photographed action at various points. In early films, intertitles were often used to convey character dialogue and to provide related descriptive or narrative material; in modern usage, the term refers almost exclusively to the latter, inserted at or near the beginning or end of a film or television show.
iris in
iris out
Italian shot

== J ==
J cut
jib
jump cut
jump scare

== K ==
key grip
A senior crew member who is responsible for supervising the grip crew, typically in order to perform tasks such as assessing what equipment is necessary at each shooting location, coordinating the transportation and set-up of this equipment, and arranging for the general movement and positioning of the camera. The key grip collaborates closely with the director of photography and relies on the best boy as their chief assistant.
key light
One of three light sources in a traditional three-point lighting set-up, generally positioned directly in front of the subject being filmed or photographed and supplemented by the back light and fill light. The key light is usually the first and most important light to be considered when staging a scene. Its purpose is to highlight the form and dimension of the subject; omitting the key light can result in a silhouette effect.

A diagram of a standard three-point lighting set-up, consisting of a key light, back light, and fill light

Kuleshov effect
The mental phenomenon by which viewers of a film interpret the juxtaposition of and interaction between sequential shots in a way that differs from their interpretation of either of the individual shots alone. This effect can be demonstrated by comparing viewers' reactions to two different sequences, each featuring an identical shot preceded or followed by different shots that suggest or evoke distinct associations; viewers tend to ascribe different emotions or meanings to the identical shots based on the mental associations implied by the adjacent shots. The effect illustrates how the interpretation of any individual shot in a motion picture depends largely on the shots immediately adjacent to it – no single shot exists in isolation.

== L ==
L cut
A type of split edit in which the picture cuts before the audio, such that the audio of the preceding shot or scene overlaps the picture from the following scene; i.e. the audio of the previous scene (often dialogue or narration) continues to play over the beginning of the next scene before cutting or fading.
leading actor
leitmotif
lens flare
letterboxing
The process of transferring film shot in a widescreen aspect ratio to standard-width video formats while preserving the film's original aspect ratio. Doing so necessarily results in each frame of the video signal being lined with horizontal mattes, usually empty black strips, above and below it. Letterboxing is common in feature films formatted for home video playback on standard-width television screens.
limited release
A type of film distribution in which a film is shown in just a small fraction of the movie theaters available in a region or country, typically only in major metropolitan markets and often at small-scale independently owned theaters; in the U.S. and Canada, a limited release is defined as a film released in less than 600 theaters nationwide. Contrast wide release.
lockup
An area being cordoned off and controlled by crew members to prevent either unwanted sound or pedestrians from ruining the take.
long shot
long take
A shot or take with a duration much longer than the conventional editing pace used in the rest of the film or of films in general. Significant camera movement and elaborate blocking techniques are often though not always elements in long takes.
low-angle shot
low-key lighting

== M ==
Martini Shot

A term used in Hollywood for the final shot set-up of the day. The Martini Shot was so named because "the next shot is out of a glass", referring to a post-wrap drink.
master shot
match cut
A type of cut from one shot to another where the composition of each shot is matched to the other by the action or subject matter depicted; e.g. in a scene depicting a duel, a long shot showing both of the duellists might cut to a close-up shot of one of the duellists in the midst of the action. Match cuts are precisely timed and coordinated so as to produce a seamless transition that is consistent with the logic of the action.
match moving
medium close-up
medium shot
Mexican filter
Yellow color filter sometimes applied in films to depict Mexican locations.
MIDI timecode
mise-en-scène
money shot
montage
Morris the Explainer
A term referring to a fictional character (by whatever name) whose job it is to explain the plot or parts of a plot to other characters and the audience.
mood lighting
The deliberate use of certain lighting characteristics in a scene or even an entire film in order to provoke a particular state of mind or feeling in the viewer.
MOS
motion picture

motion picture content rating system
movement mechanism
movie camera
multiple-camera setup
multiple exposure

== N ==
negative cost
negative cutting
non-diegetic sound

== O ==
on location
See location shooting.
one liner schedule
one-shot film

A feature-length motion picture filmed in one long, uninterrupted take by a single camera, or edited in such a way as to give the impression that it was.
opening credits
(for a film)
opening shot
(for a scene)
over cranking
over the shoulder shot (OTS)

== P ==
pan and scan
panning
Pivoting or swivelling a camera horizontally about a fixed vertical axis, usually somewhat slowly, similar to the motion of a person turning their head from left to right. In the resulting image, new material appears on one side of the screen as it exits from the other; perspective lines may or may not be conspicuous enough to reveal to the viewer that the entire image is being seen from a stationary vantage point (as opposed to the camera as a whole moving, as if mounted on a camera dolly).
persistence of vision
phenakistiscope
pillarboxing
pitch
A concise verbal presentation of an idea or concept for a film or television series, generally presented or "pitched" by a screenwriter or director to a producer or studio executive in the hope of attracting financing to pay for the further development of the idea into a full-scale production.
plot device
point of view shot
POV shot
point of view

post-production
The part of the filmmaking process that includes all stages of production occurring after shooting or recording the film's various scenes, sound effects, voice-overs, and/or other segments.
pre-production
principal photography
producer
production assistant (PA)
A crew position with a range of responsibilities, from distributing scripts to locking up locations.
production board
production report
production schedule
production strip
prop
Any object used on set by actors as part of a scene. The term "prop" sometimes implies a mock or imitation of an actual object, or an accurately rendered but non-functional replica, as with a prop gun, but may more broadly encompass all objects handled by actors during filming, whether artificial or genuine.
propmaker
An off-set crew member who builds custom props or scenery for a production.

== R ==
racking focus
reaction shot
A shot which cuts away from the main scene in order to show the reaction of a character to it. It is a basic unit of film grammar.
read-through

An organized live reading of the screenplay or script of a film, television, radio, or theatre production, usually in an early stage of production and with the actors cast in each speaking role present around a table and reading their respective parts. Non-speaking parts and those that have not yet been cast may be read by stand-ins or members of the production team.
reel
reflector
Rembrandt lighting
A lighting technique used in studio portrait photography and cinematography which is characterized by the presence of an illuminated triangle beneath the eye of the subject on the less illuminated side of the face. This effect is generally achieved with the use of a single light source positioned to one side of the subject and a reflector on the opposite side, and is popular because it is capable of producing images which appear both natural and compelling with a minimum of equipment.
replay
reveal
A plot device in narrative structure in which a previously unseen key character or element of the plot is exposed to the reader or audience for the first time. Major reveals often occur at critical moments in the development of the plot, such as the climax.
reverse angle shot
roadshow theatrical release
roll
1. A spool or core-load of film stock.
2. A command to a film crew to start recording a scene with cameras and sound recorders, and/or to the cast to proceed with the acting out of a scene from a certain point.
3. The rotation of a camera around the lens axis. Contrast pitch and yaw.
rotoscoping
An animation technique to capture realistic motion by tracing live action frame by frame.
rough cut
The second of three stages of offline film editing, in which shots and sequences are laid out in approximate relationship and chronology, without detailed attention to the individual cutting points.

== S ==
scene
screen direction
The direction that actors or objects appear to be moving on the screen from the point of view of the camera or the audience. A fundamental rule of film grammar and film editing is that movement from one edited shot to another must maintain consistency of screen direction in order to avoid audience confusion.
screenplay

A written work by screenwriters for a film, television show, or video game. Like theatrical playbooks, screenplays are a form of narration in which the movements, actions, expressions, and dialogue of the characters are explicitly described in a specific format; visual or cinematographic cues may also be written, as well as descriptions of scenes and scene changes. Screenplays can be original works or adaptations from existing pieces of writing.
screenwriter
screenwriting
script breakdown
script supervisor
scriptment
sequence shot
shot
A series of frames that runs for an uninterrupted period of time. In production, the term refers more specifically to the period between the moment the camera starts rolling and the moment it stops; in film editing, it refers to the continuous footage or sequence between two consecutive edits or cuts. Shots are essential aspects of all screen productions, including both film and television, where angles, transitions, and cuts are used by the filmmaker to further express emotions, ideas, and movement.
shot/reverse shot
A film technique in which one character is shown looking at another character, and then the other character is shown looking back at the first character in a separate shot. Since the characters are shown facing in opposite directions, the audience is led to assume that they are looking at each other.
shooting in the round
A style of cinematography in which the 180-degree rule is broken and the actors are filmed from all sides.
shooting schedule
shooting script
single-camera setup
slow cutting
A film editing technique which uses shots of long duration, i.e. with cuts occurring at long intervals. Most shots longer than about 15 seconds seem slow to modern-day Western audiences accustomed to mainstream films, where slow cuts are uncommon.
slow motion
smash cut
A technique of film editing in which one scene abruptly cuts to another for aesthetic, narrative, or emotional effect. To this end, the smash cut usually occurs at a crucial moment in a scene where the audience would not expect a cut; to heighten the impact, a disparity in the type of scene on either side of the cut is often emphasized, e.g. cutting from a tense or fast-paced scene to a pleasant or tranquil one.
SMPTE timecode
A set of cooperating standards for labeling individual frames of video or film with a timecode, defined by the Society of Motion Picture and Television Engineers.
soft light
sound design
sound designer
sound editor
sound effect

sound report
spec script

A non-commissioned and unsolicited screenplay or film treatment, i.e. one that is written of a screenwriter's own accord, usually with the intention of having the script optioned and eventually purchased by a producer, production company, or film studio.
split edit
split screen
special effect
special effects supervisor
stage lighting
stalker vision

stand-in
A person who substitutes for an actor during an early stage of film or television production, prior to actual filming, often for technical purposes such as lighting and camera set-up but also for script and storyboarding purposes such as a table-read, especially when the actors intended to portray certain characters have not yet been cast.
Steadicam
A popular brand of camera-stabilizing mounts for film cameras invented by Garrett Brown and introduced in 1975 by Cinema Products Corporation. These mounts mechanically isolate the operator's movement, allowing for a smooth shot even when the camera moves over an irregular surface.
step outline
stop motion
storyboard
A graphical arrangement of images or illustrations depicting the scenes and characters of a motion picture, animation, or interactive media production and displayed in sequence for the purpose of allowing writers, directors, or artists to pre-visualize and easily modify the chronology and structure of the narrative and/or the compositions of and transitions between particular shots. The storyboarding process is one of the earliest steps in pre-production.
storyboard artist
striplight
stunt double
stunt performer
substitution splice
supporting actor

== T ==
take
A single continuous recording of a performance, often denoted with a number and used to track the stages of filming, especially the filming of a particular scene. Multiple takes may be filmed for the same scene or performance so as to provide editors with more than one option from which to choose when editing.
test screening
A preview showing of a film or television show prior to a wider general release in order to gauge audience reaction.
tilt
A cinematographic technique in which the camera remains in a fixed position but pivots up or down in a vertical plane, i.e. upon its own x-axis. Tilting the camera results in a motion similar to someone raising or lowering their head to look up or down. It is distinguished from panning, in which the camera is pivoted horizontally left or right. Pan and tilt can be used simultaneously. In some situations the lens itself may be tilted with respect to the fixed camera body in order to generate greater depth of focus.

Tilting a camera

timecode

A sequence of numeric codes generated at regular intervals by a timing synchronization system and commonly used in video production and other applications which require temporal coordination or logging of recordings or actions.
time-lapse
A technique in which the frequency at which film frames are captured is much lower than the frequency at which they are played back when viewing the sequence. When played at a normal playback speed, time appears to be moving faster or "lapsing". For example, if images of a scene are captured at a rate of 1 frame per second but then played back at a standard 30 frames per second, the resulting sequence appears to be occurring 30 times faster than it did in reality. Time-lapse photography is the opposite of high-speed or slow-motion photography, in which film is captured at a much higher rate than at which it is played back, appearing to slow down an otherwise fast action.

A time-lapse film of plant seeds germinating

title sequence
tracking shot
Any shot in which the camera follows backward, forward, or moves alongside the subject being filmed. The camera may be mounted on a dolly designed to move along a dedicated track, or it may be moved manually via a handheld steadycam or gimbal. Tracking shots are often long, continuous sequences lasting multiple seconds.
trunk shot
two shot
typecasting

== V ==
video production
videography
The process of capturing moving images on electronic media or streaming media, including in the broadest sense methods of video production and post-production. Once considered the video equivalent of cinematography, the emergence of digital video recording technologies has blurred the distinction between the two, such that in modern usage any type of video recording (e.g. television news broadcasting) may be referred to as videography, while cinematography is usually reserved for large-scale commercial motion picture production.
visual effects
visual effects supervisor
voice acting
The art of performing voice-overs to present a character or to provide narration to an audience.
voice actor

An actor who performs using only their voice, i.e. through voice-overs. Voice acting is used especially in radio productions and animated films, where the actual providers of the voices of speaking characters are never seen, but is also commonly used for narration in live-action films. Many voice actors are not exclusively voice actors but also act in standard non-voice roles in other productions.
voice artist
voice-over

== W ==
walk and talk
whip pan
wide release
Is a motion picture that is playing nationally. This is contrast to a film that is having premiere showings at cinemas, or is in limited release at selected cinemas in larger cities around the country. In the American film industry, a movie is considered by some to be a wide release when it plays in 600 cinemas or more in the United States and Canada.
widescreen
wild
A piece of the set or scenery that is designed to be easily removed for crew or camera access.
wipe
worm's eye view
wrap

== X ==
X rating

== Z ==
zoetrope
One of several animation devices predating modern film techniques that produces the illusion of motion by displaying a sequence of drawings or photographs showing progressive phases of that motion.
zoom

== See also ==
- Film
- Filmmaking
- Cinematic techniques
- Glossary of broadcasting terms
- Glossary of video terms
- Outline of film
