= Index of articles related to motion pictures =

The film industry is built upon many technologies and techniques, drawing upon photography, stagecraft, music, and many other disciplines. Following is an index of specific terminology applicable thereto.

== 0–9 ==
180 degree rule - 30 degree rule

== A ==
A and B editing - A roll - Accelerated montage - Acousmatic - Action axis - Aerial shot - Ambient light - American night - American shot - Anamorphic - Angle of view - Angle plus angle - Angular resolution - Answer print - Aperture - Apple box - Artificial light - ASA speed rating - Aspect ratio - Autofocus - Automated dialogue replacement - Available light - Axial cut

== B ==
B roll - Baby plates - Backlot - Background lighting - Balloon light - Barn doors (lighting) - Below the line (film production) - Best boy - Blocking - Bluescreen - Boom shot - Boomerang (lighting) - Bounce board - Brightness (lighting) - Broadside (lighting) - Butterfly (lighting)

== C ==
C-Stand - Callier effect - Cameo lighting - Cameo (credits image) - Cameo role - Cameo shot - Camera angle - Camera boom - Camera crane - Camera dolly - Camera shot - Candles per square foot - Character animation - Choker shot - Chroma key - Chromatic aberration - CinemaDNG - Clapboard - Clock wipe - Close shot - Close up shot - Cold open - Color conversion filter - Color corrected fluorescent light - Color correction - Color gel - Color grading - Color rendering index - Color reversal internegative - Color temperature - Color timer - Continuity - Cooke Triplet lens - Crafts service - Crane shot - Creative geography - Cross cutting - Cutaway - Cut in - cut out - Cutting on action

== D ==
Daily rushes - Day for night - Deadspot (lighting) - Deep focus - Depth of field - Depth of focus - Dichroic lens - Diegetic sound - Diffraction - Diffuser (lighting) - Digital audio - Digital audio tape recorder - Digital cinema - Digital compositing - Digital film - Digital image processing - Digital intermediate - Digital negative - Digital projection - Dimmer (lighting) - Dissolve (filmmaking) - DMX (lighting) - Dolly grip - Dolly shot - Dolly zoom - Double-system recording - Douser (lighting) - DPX film format - Drawn on film animation - Dubbing - Dutch angle - Dynamic composition

== E ==
Effects light - Electrotachyscope - Ellipsoidal reflector spot light - Establishing shot - Extreme close-up - Extreme long shot - Eye-level camera angle

== F ==
F-number - F-stop - Fade-in - Fade-out - Fast cutting - Fast motion - Feature length - Field of view - Fill light - Film gate - Film modification - Film plane - Film recorder - Film scanner - Film score - Film speed - Filter (photography) - Fine cut - Fisheye lens - Flicker fusion threshold - Focal length - Focus (optics) - Focus puller - Foley artist - Follow focus - Follow shot - Followspot light - Forced perspective - Footage - Fourth wall - Frame - Frame composition - Frame rate - Freeze frame shot - Fresnel lens - Full frame - Full shot

== G ==
Gobo (lighting) - Go motion - Godspot effect - Greenlight - Grip - Gaffer

== H ==
Hard light - Head-on shot - Heart wipe - High-angle shot - High camera angle - High concept - High-intensity discharge lamp - High-key lighting - Hip hop montage - Hydrargyrum medium-arc iodide lamp

== K ==
Key grip - key light

== L ==
letterbox - light reflector

== M ==
Martini Shot - Mise en scène - montage - MOS - movement mechanism - movie camera - MIDI timecode

== N ==
negative cutting

== O ==
overcranking

== P ==
pan and scan - persistence of vision - pillarboxing - point-of-view shot - point of view - post-production

== R ==
Reel - Replay

== S ==
screenplay - slow cutting - slow motion - sound stage - stand-in - storyboard

== T ==
take - timecode - time-lapse - tracking shot - trailer

== U-Z ==
undercranking - voice artist - voice-over - widescreen - wrap

== See also ==
- Film technique
- Film crew
- Filming production roles
- Glossary of motion picture terms
- List of film formats
- List of film topics
- List of basic film topics
