= Cutaway (filmmaking) =

Filmmaking technique

In film and video, a cutaway is the interruption of a continuously filmed action by inserting a view of something else. It is usually followed by a cut back to the first shot. A cutaway scene is the interruption of a scene with the insertion of another scene, generally unrelated or only peripherally related to the original scene. The interruption is usually quick, and is usually, although not always, ended by a return to the original scene. The effect is of commentary to the original scene and creates variety.

== Usage ==
The most common use of cutaway shots in dramatic films is to adjust the pace of the main action, to conceal the deletion of some unwanted part of the main shot, or to allow the joining of parts of two versions of that shot.

Cutaways are also used often in older horror films in place of special effects. For example, a shot of a zombie getting its head cut off may, for instance, start with a view of an axe being swung through the air, followed by a close-up of the actor swinging it, then followed by a cut back to the now severed head. George A. Romero, creator of the Dead Series, and Tom Savini pioneered effects that removed the need for cutaways in horror films.

In news broadcasting and documentary work, the cutaway is used much as it would be in fiction. On location, there is usually just one camera to film an interview, and it is usually trained on the interviewee. Often, there is also only one microphone. After the interview, the interviewer usually repeats their questions while they are being filmed, with pauses that act as if the answers are listened to. These shots can be used as cutaways. Cutaways to the interviewer, called noddies, can also be used to cover cuts.

The cutaway does not necessarily contribute any dramatic content of its own, but is used to help the editor assemble a longer sequence. For that reason, editors choose cutaways related to the main action, such as another action or object in the same location.

The animated series Family Guy is noted for its frequent use of cutaway gags, where the main plot is interrupted by comical gags in unrelated scenarios. This has been described to be oversaturated within Family Guy's humor to an extent where it received unfavorable comparisons between contemporaries The Simpsons and South Park, leading to the former removing cutaway gags from future episodes and mockery from the latter.

== See also ==
- Buffer shot
- Cross-cutting
- Dissolve (filmmaking)
- Fast cutting
- Flashback
- Jump cut
- L cut
- Match cut
- Shot/reverse shot
- Slow cutting
- Cutscene
