= External rhythm =

Pacing aspect of film editing

The animated short film Big Buck Bunny uses long shots and a transition as external rhythm to create a calm atmosphere.

In filmmaking, external rhythm, also called cutting rhythm, is a pacing aspect of film editing defined by the duration of the shots that make up a scene. Adjusting these durations establishes a rhythmic pattern that can complement or contrast with the internal rhythm and content of a scene or sequence.

== Characteristics ==
External rhythm can substantially control a film's overall pace. This is divided into micro pacing (pacing within a scene) and macro pacing (which looks at the film as a whole). The external rhythm of macro pacing refers to the progressive duration of shots and scenes throughout a film. A baseline for this is the modern average shot length of 4–6 seconds, which used to be 8–11 seconds in Classical Hollywood.

A skillful cutting rhythm skims lower or higher than the baseline for effect, depending on the scene or the sequence encapsulating it. The kinds of transitions (e.g., cut, jump cut, wipe, dissolve) used from shot to shot or from scene to scene also affect the nature of the cutting rhythm.

== Application ==
Cutting editors select each editing point (the precise frame where a transition happens) and angle for synchronization purposes, to convey juxtapositional meaning, or to support the emotional tone. In live action, scenes are usually shot with extensive camera coverage; such an editor must studiously watch the footage covered before working.

A contrast with the internal rhythm (whatever appears or moves in a scene) can create an intentional tonal discrepancy, as shown by the shower scene with erratic cuts in Alfred Hitchcock's Psycho, which builds unsettlement. Likewise, a similarity between the two can pinpoint a tone. For example, the baseline shot of Paul Thomas Anderson's There Will Be Blood (~13.3 seconds) is far longer than its era's baseline, and there are equally slow internal movements to grow a dreadful tone.

External rhythm is not solely visual. A prelap (voiceover before a visual transition) can soften a scene cut by introducing a more subtle auditory transition prior. Manipulating the viewers' perceived flow of time is also part of it; for example, using slow motion to build suspense or dread.

== History ==
Before Classical Hollywood, cutting editing primarily used cuts from scene to scene, and not much variety or flavor.

=== Classical ===
In Classical Hollywood (1900s–1970s), classical continuity, emphasized by directing the viewer's focus to a pre-existing consistency of story, was most popular. Each scene would match narrative time, with natural, simple cuts.

For example, a scene of ordering from a barista would last a minute or two. (First a 7-second shot of the cashier, then a 9-second shot of the table, then an 11-second shot of the customer's friends sitting nearby, etc.) But for stories that would span weeks, months, or even years, a fade or dissolve transition called an ellipsis would commonly indicate a break in time.

== Effect on quality ==
External rhythm's effect on pace extends to the film's quality. A poor rhythm can damage the viewing experience by making it awkward, whereas a strong rhythm does the opposite and especially mobilizes the artistic intent. Close communication between the editor and the producer has been seen to better carry said intent.

The rhythmic pattern of film editing is often subconscious. Sometimes, poor rhythm in a previous scene can create a ripple effect that dampens the impact of later scenes. Therefore, investigative energy is occasionally needed to fix a "gut senses" problem.

== See also ==
- Internal rhythm – Dichotomous opposite of external rhythm
- Camera coverage
- Film transition
