= Cross-cutting =

Type of film editing technique

Cross-cutting is an editing technique most often used in films to establish action occurring at the same time, and often in the same place. In a cross-cut, the camera will cut away from one action to another action, which can suggest the simultaneity of these two actions. Cross-cutting can also be used for characters in a film with the same goals but different ways of achieving them.

Suspense may be added by cross-cutting. It is built through the expectations that it creates and in the hopes that it will be explained with time. Cross-cutting also forms parallels; it illustrates a narrative action that happens in several places at approximately the same time. For instance, in D. W. Griffith's A Corner in Wheat (1909), the film cross-cuts between the activities of rich businessmen and poor people waiting in line for bread. This creates a sharp dichotomy between the two actions, and encourages the viewer to compare the two shots. Often, this contrast is used for strong emotional effect, and frequently at the climax of a film. The rhythm of, or length of time between, cross-cuts can also set the rhythm of a scene. Increasing the rapidity between two different actions may add tension to a scene, much in the same manner of using short, declarative sentences in a work of literature.

Cross-cutting was established as a film-making technique relatively early in film history (two examples being Edwin Porter's 1903 short The Great Train Robbery and Louis J. Gasnier's 1908 short The Runaway Horse); Griffith was its most famous practitioner. The technique is showcased in his Biograph work, such as A Corner in Wheat and 1911's The Lonedale Operator. His 1915 film The Birth of a Nation contains textbook examples of cross-cutting and firmly established it as a staple of film editing. Mrinal Sen has used cross-cutting effectively in his agit-prop film Interview, which achieved significant commercial success. Christopher Nolan uses cross-cutting extensively in films such as Interstellar, The Dark Knight and Inception - particularly in the latter, in which sequences depict multiple simultaneous levels of consciousness. Cloud Atlas is known for its numerous cross-cuts between the film's six different stories, some lasting only a few seconds yet spanning across hundreds of years in different locations around the world. Its cuts are eased by the similar emotional tone depicted by each side's action.

== See also ==
- Buffer shot
- Cutaway (filmmaking)
- Dissolve (filmmaking)
- Fast cutting
- Jump cut
- Match cut
- Shot reverse shot
- Slow cutting
