= Richard Francis-Bruce =

Australian film editor

Richard Francis-Bruce AM
- Born: 10 December 1948 (age 77); Sydney, New South Wales, Australia
- Occupation: Film editor
- Years active: 1978–present
- Spouse: Susan

Richard Leslie Francis-Bruce AM (born 10 December 1948) is an Australian film editor who has received several nominations for the Academy Award for Best Film Editing.

== Career ==
Francis-Bruce aspired to be a cinematographer like his father, Jack Bruce, who worked for Hollywood players like Cecil B. DeMille and the Famous Lansky Players. Nonetheless, Richard's aspirations landed him an editing gig at the Australian Broadcasting Corporation (ABC) in Sydney, where he spent 15 years honing his craft.

Francis-Bruce collaborated with filmmaker George Miller on a plethora of films including Mad Max Beyond Thunderdome (1985), The Witches of Eastwick (1987), and Lorenzo's Oil (1992).

Francis-Bruce later earned Academy Award nominations for his Best Film Editing work on Frank Darabont's The Shawshank Redemption (1994), David Fincher's Seven (1995) and Wolfgang Petersen's Air Force One (1997). Francis-Bruce was nominated for ACE Eddie Awards for The Shawshank Redemption, The Rock (directed by Michael Bay - 1996), Air Force One, and for Harry Potter and the Philosopher's Stone (directed by Chris Columbus - 2001). In 1997, he was invited to become a member of the American Cinema Editors (ACE).

In 1996, Francis-Bruce visited Australia and spoke at a seminar at the Australian Film Television and Radio School entitled Frame by Frame. Francis-Bruce explained the importance of understanding internal rhythm and external rhythm as well as the choices he made in and between every shot throughout the film Seven.

== Filmography ==
Year	Film	Director	Notes
1974	Lindsay's Boy	Frank Arnold	Television film
1975	They Don't Clap Losers	John Power	Television film
1978	Because He's My Friend	Ralph Nelson	Television film
1978	Puzzle	Gordon Hessler	Television film
1983	Goodbye Paradise	Carl Schultz	
1983	Careful, He Might Hear You	Carl Schultz	Nominated — AACTA Award for Best Editing
1985	Mad Max Beyond Thunderdome	George Miller; George Ogilvie	
1986	Short Changed	George Ogilvie	Nominated — AACTA Award for Best Editing
1986	The Mosquito Coast	Peter Weir	Editor
1987	The Witches of Eastwick	George Miller	
1987	Bullseye	Carl Schultz	Nominated — AACTA Award for Best Editing
1988	Barracuda	Pino Amenta	Television film
1989	Dead Calm	Phillip Noyce	AACTA Award for Best Editing
1989	The Blood of Heroes	David Peoples	
1990	Cadillac Man	Roger Donaldson	
1991	Crooked Hearts	Michael Bortman	
1992	The Nightman	Charles Haid	Television film
1992	Lorenzo's Oil	George Miller	
1993	Sliver	Phillip Noyce	
1994	The Shawshank Redemption	Frank Darabont	Nominated — Academy Award for Best Film Editing; Nominated — ACE Eddie Award for Best Edited Feature Film – Dramatic
1994	Speechless	Ron Underwood	
1995	Seven	David Fincher	Nominated — Academy Award for Best Film Editing
1996	The Rock	Michael Bay	Nominated — ACE Eddie Award for Best Edited Feature Film – Dramatic
1997	Air Force One	Wolfgang Petersen	Nominated — Academy Award for Best Film Editing; Nominated — ACE Eddie Award for Best Edited Feature Film – Dramatic; Nominated — Satellite Award for Best Editing
1998	The Replacement Killers	Antoine Fuqua	Special thanks
1998	Goodbye Lover	Roland Joffé	Additional editor
1999	Instinct	Jon Turteltaub	
1999	The Green Mile	Frank Darabont	
2000	The Perfect Storm	Wolfgang Petersen	
2001	Harry Potter and the Philosopher's Stone	Chris Columbus	Nominated — ACE Eddie Award for Best Edited Feature Film – Dramatic; Nominated — Satellite Award for Best Editing Film released as Harry Potter and the Sorcerer's Stone in the US
2002	Path to War	John Frankenheimer	Television film
2003	The Italian Job	F. Gary Gray	
2004	The Forgotten	Joseph Ruben	
2007	Ghost Rider	Mark Steven Johnson	
2008	David & Fatima	Alain Zaloum	
2009	Daybreakers	Spierig brothers	Additional editor
2010	Repo Men	Miguel Sapochnik	
2010	Killers	Robert Luketic	
2010	Main Street	John Doyle	
2012	For Greater Glory	Dean Wright	
2013	Oblivion	Joseph Kosinski	
2014	Divergent	Neil Burger	
2015	Truth	James Vanderbilt	
2016	Ben-Hur	Timur Bekmambetov	
2017	Fifty Shades Darker	James Foley	
2018	Fifty Shades Freed	James Foley	
