= Cut (transition) =

Abrupt transition from one film sequence to another

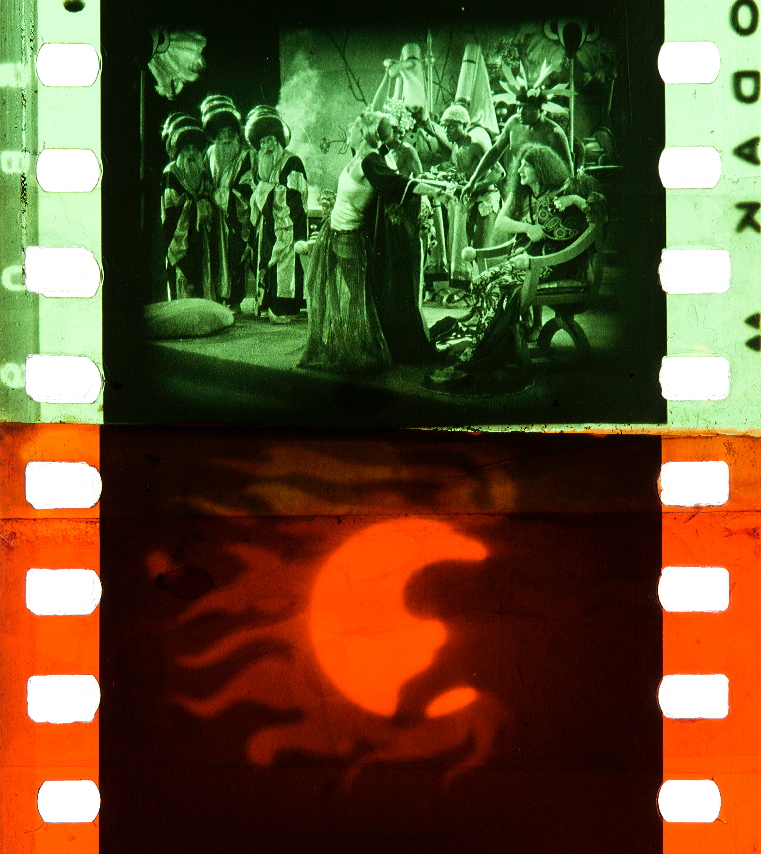
A cut created by joining two different shots in a nitrate film strip

In the post-production process of film editing and video editing, a cut is an abrupt, but usually trivial film transition from one sequence to another. It is synonymous with the term edit, though "edit" can imply any number of transitions or effects. The cut, dissolve, and wipe serve as the three primary transitions. The term refers to the physical action of cutting film or videotape, but also refers to a similar edit performed in software; it has also become associated with the resulting visual "break".

== History ==
Due to the short length of early film stock, splicing was necessary to join together segments into long-form. Actuality directors spliced together reels prior to shooting to record for longer periods of time. Narrative directors, on the other hand, preferred shooting for shorter lengths, editing together shot footage. In either case, film was cut (and subsequently joining the cut segments) to remove excess footage, focusing attention on significant elements.

The cut has retained its purpose to this day, with alternative uses arising to achieve special effects.

== Verbal command ==
To signal the end of media capture, this command is issued primarily by the director, to cast and crew. (It is very unusual for others to yell "cut" without an exceptional reason; mistakes are re-shot during the same take, if possible.) In contrast, a "roll" command signals the beginning of shooting.

In between these commands and the actual footage to be captured, various marking elements (the slate), preparatory actions (extras, effects, or other costly elements), and the director's "Action!" command are also recorded. These are edited out to effect a seamless presentation.

== Proper cut ==
In practice, the cut does not break the suspension of disbelief necessary to keep an audience engaged to a narrative or program. The cut represents a continuous transition in setting and time—in turn, the dissolve and wipe respectively identify changes in time and setting. In many cases, cuts are also used in place of dissolves or wipes for minor changes, or to edit away insignificant details to maintain pace. Usage of the cut in this manner conforms to the goals of continuity editing, which deemphasizes the presence of the film crew.

Cuts serve as transitions between camera angles, such a wide establishing shot and a medium shot. Footage of a moving character may be captured from multiple angles rather than a tracking shot, either for aesthetic reasons or to lessen the risk of damaging a camera while in motion.

Cuts are often used in sections of dialogue so that the director may employ close-ups without unnecessary (and visually disturbing) movement of the camera. Such cuts usually follow the 180-degree rule, where the camera angles are kept on the same side of an imaginary border drawn between the subjects.

On a broadcast television multiple-camera setup, cuts are performed at the vision mixer by the technical director by simply selecting a different source. On single camera or film setups, cuts are performed by the editor using either a linear or non-linear editing system. Film may still be cut and spliced, but today's editing systems have made such "destructive" edits unnecessary. Instead, edit points identify where the system duplicates source footage onto the master reel.

== Variations ==
- An L-cut is when video and audio are edited asynchronously. For example, the sound of approaching cars in an interior shot alerts the viewer that the next scene will most likely involve traffic or take place outside.
- A jump cut is a cut, within the setting and time frame of a scene, where continuity is visibly broken. Though a mistake in many cases, it can also be used for dramatic effect. It is not to be confused with a cut used where a dissolve or wipe would be (perhaps more) appropriate.
- A cutaway is when footage extraneous to a scene is overlaid, visually interrupting the narrative but perhaps displaying some important action taking place simultaneously, or an action referenced in dialogue. Audio cutaways are much less common, as they do not achieve the same effect.
- A cross cut is similar to a cut used in dialogue, but where the subjects are not necessarily in the same setting (or even time frame). It establishes the same intimate relation as a dialogue cut.
- A match cut, like the cross cut, links together two scenes that visually or otherwise resemble each other.
- Cutting on action refers to a cut that links together two compositionally similar scenes. For example, the imminent pulling of a gun trigger may, prior to the gunshot, cut to a champagne cork firing off.

== See also ==
- Long take
- Fast cutting
- Slow cutting
