= Cut shot =

A cut shot is a type of shot in several sports.

- In golf, it is a shot that, for a right-handed golfer, curves from left to right. Unlike a slice, a cut shot is intentional. Compare: fade.
- In pool, it is a shot in which the cue ball strikes the object ball off-center, so as to deflect it at an angle.
- In volleyball, it is a spike (an attack hit) that is hit from the hitter's strong side and travels at a sharp angle across the net. A cut shot is like a cross-court hit except that the ball is hit at a much sharper angle. Cut shots are also a much softer hit ball.
- In cricket, it is a cross-batted shot by the batsman into the off side, usually the point area or backward of point - see Batting (cricket)#Cut

'Cut' and 'shot' are also terms used in film and film editing.
