= Prelap =

Sound or dialogue that begins before the cut to its scene

Prelap is a screenwriting and film editing term that describes when the audience is introduced to a nonvisual aspect of a scene, such as a sound or line of dialogue, before the cut to the scene. It is related to the J cut and the sound bridge.

== In screenplays ==
In a screenplay, a prelap is typically marked in the dialogue line of the character speaking, as in the following example:

ADRIAN (V.O., PRELAP)
Peter?  Peter, where are you?

EXT. THE WOODS – DAY

Adrian is out looking for Peter.  
We see him wander around in the small forest.

ADRIAN
Peter?  Hello?  Are you there?

In this example, Adrian's voice precedes the scene out in the woods. The "V.O." means "Voice Over" and the "PRELAP" indicates that Adrian's dialogue should be heard before the next scene begins. The character speaking might not be in the scene at the time of the prelap.

== See also ==
- J cut
- Sound bridge
- Film editing
