= Daily production report =

Filmmaking form

A daily production report (DPR) or production report (PR) in filmmaking is the form filled out each day of production for a movie or television show to summarize what occurred that day. There is no standard template for a production report and each show usually has an original template, often created before production begins by one of the assistant directors. Besides superficial differences, most forms record the same information and are simply a series of blank tables created in Excel printed double-sided on a legal sized (8 × 14) sheet of paper. The purpose of this form is to keep track of a production's progress and expenses. It is finally sent to studio executives and is permanently filed to serve as a legal record.

== Front ==
The very top lists the production company name, production title, director, producers, unit production managers, assistant directors, the total number of scheduled production days, and the current production day. Below this, the majority of the DPR combines information from several different forms on one page for easy reading:

- The script notes from the script supervisor. This details what scenes and pages were completed or were failed to be completed that day, as well as the official lunch time.
- The Camera Report details from the camera Loader. This lists how many feet of each different film stock were used and subtracts the total used from the previous day's inventory to determine how much film the production has left on hand. Other information on this form is the amount of film printed, considered no good, and how many feet of short ends were created or used.
- The Sound Report details. This form holds information about what is recorded on each sound tape.
- The Exhibit G from the First Team production assistant. This form indicates the work status, in and out times, the meal times, meal penalties, and pick-up and drop-off times of the principal cast and bears their signatures.
- The Extras Breakdown from the Background PA. This form records the number of background actors and lists their pay rates, in and out times, lunch times, meal penalties, and overtime, and whether they performed any special actions or services that merit bonus pay.

== Back ==
The back lists the names of the entire crew and production office staff separated by department, with each person's in and out times, meal times, and meal penalties. The back also records the number of meals consumed (and thus paid for by the company), any special equipment rented, and has a notes section to mark down any miscellaneous yet important information, like details of a theft, fire or accident.

== Filling out the report ==
The report is usually completed by a script supervisor an assistant director, a Paperwork PA, or a DGA trainee. Manpower, crew information, and equipment information is collected from the Key PA, the Best Boy Grip, Best Boy Electric, 2nd Camera Assistant, Assistant Props, Set Scenic, Key Hair, and Key Make-Up during the day. This information can be difficult to gather as it involves finding a moment when these busy crew members are free to talk. The Paperwork PA needs to be perceptive and only interrupt them at a good moment. The number of meals served is counted by the PA during lunch, usually requiring they wait by the buffet line and eat last in order to count how many plates are taken by everyone. The assistant directors and producers will tell the Paperwork PA what notes to add.

At the end of the day the Paperwork PA receives the other forms and adds the information to the front. They will usually drop the DPR off at the production office after wrap to be filed, first making a few copies to give to the UPM and assistant directors the next day so they can double-check the information and have corrections called into the office if they disagree with any information.
