= Beam projector =

Lensless stage lighting device

A beam projector is a lensless stage lighting instrument with very little beam spread. It uses two reflectors. The primary reflector is a parabolic reflector and the secondary reflector is a spherical reflector. The parabolic reflector organizes the light into nearly parallel beams, and the spherical reflector is placed in front of the lamp to reflect light from the lamp back to the parabolic reflector, which reduces spill. The result is an intense shaft of light that cannot be easily controlled or modified. Beam projectors are often used to create a godspot effect. The beam projector no longer is used to the extent that it once was, as newer fixtures and PAR lamps have created easier ways to produce the effect. A similar effect can be produced using ETC Source Four PAR fixtures with a clear lens. A snoot/top hat can be added to control spill.
