= J cut =

Film transition in which the audio cuts before the video

In film editing, a J cut is a type of film transition in which the audio from a following scene overlaps the picture from the preceding scene, so that the audio portion of the later scene starts playing before its picture as a lead-in to the visual cut. Also called an audio lead or audio advance, it is a variant of the split edit technique.

The name of the cut refers to the shape of audio and video pieces of the second of two scenes cut together when it was done on analog film, forming a shape similar to the letter "J" on the timeline. The tail of the "J" represents the audio from the next clip, while the main body represents the video from the previous clip. This technique has been applied since sound film first appeared.

== See also ==
- Film transition
- Jump cut
- L cut
- Match cut
- Split edit
- Prelap
