= Daily progress report =

Filmmaking report

A daily progress report is a filmmaking report that is produced at the end of each shooting day by the First Assistant Director (1AD) and passed to the Production Manager for approval.

The daily progress report contains a record of what scenes were shot that day, the locations used, the number of meals served, the vehicles and equipment utilised and any other notable events or incidents.
