= Morris the Explainer =

American film industry term

Morris the Explainer is an old American film industry term referring to a fictional character (by whatever name) whose job it is to explain the plot or parts of a plot to other characters and the audience. This storytelling cliché of narrative exposition is also known by the names Jake the Explainer, Sam the Explainer and Irving the Explainer.

The origin of Morris the Explainer is probably found in Yiddish theatre, where the character reported on the story as a generally used device of narrative exposition. In film it was common since early mystery film plots, where the end often consists of the police or a private investigator confronting a room full of suspects and explaining who committed the crime, why and how it was done. This easy-way-out technique was given a funny send-up in A Shot in the Dark by Blake Edwards and William Peter Blatty, where Inspector Clouseau (Peter Sellers) delivers a perfect parody of crude mystery solutions in film. A famous example for a Morris the Explainer from a serious context is in the Matrix film series by the Wachowskis, in which the Oracle's role as mentor is also used for extensive narrative exposition.

However, an explainer doesn't have to occur only at the end of a story, and a similar technique found throughout a modern film narrative is the expositioning character, who is used by writers to explain certain elements of the story and give background information along the way. Expositioning can surface as the so-called technobabble, e.g. in television series like Star Trek: Voyager, or as an over-psychologized storytelling, where the writer prefers to let the characters talk about their emotions and motivations rather than letting them act according to their needs and intentions. The expositioning technique is often referred to as a plot dump due to its inferior narrative quality. A related parody was created as the character Basil Exposition for the Austin Powers films.
