= Split edit =

Film transition where the audio and video cut at different times

In film editing, a split edit is a film transition from one shot to another in which transition of the audio and video happen at different times. This is often done to enhance the aesthetics or flow of the film, allowing the audience to see context either before or after of speaking rather than simply the speaking itself. Without split edit, a conversation between two people can feel like a tennis match.

Split edits are also used to hide transitions between scenes. They can be very effective in editing dialogue scenes shot with a single camera using multiple takes. The ability to cut the picture/video separately from the sound/audio allows the sound from the various takes to flow smoothly even though the picture cuts are at different places. In longer shots, this allows the editor to use the picture from one take with the sound from another take if the dialogue reading is better.

Traditionally, split edits have been described as overlapping the sound, not to be confused with overlapping dialogue, which involves laying one sound track over another sound track.

With the proliferation of computer-based non-linear editing, different variants of split edit received their own names based on how the video being edited is presented on the timeline. A variant of split edit when the audio from preceding scene overlaps the video from the following scene is known as L cut. If the audio from the following scene overlaps the video from the preceding scene, this cut is known as J cut.

In 2011 Barry Salt investigated 33 American films made between 1936 and 2014 and noted that "the use of J-edits does seem to have increased in recent times, to a proportion roughly equal to that of L-edits" although because of the small sample of films studied, he was careful not to conclude that to become a trend.

== See also ==
- L cut
- J cut
- Match cut
- Jump cut
