= Film inventory report =

The Film Inventory Report or Daily Raw Stock Log is a filmmaking term for a report produced by the clapper loader each day. The report shows how much raw film stock was used that day, the number of good and no-good shots and the amount of film stock wasted.
