= Dissolve (filmmaking) =

Type of film transition in which one sequences fades over another

A dissolve transition between two still images

In the post-production process of film and video editing, a dissolve (sometimes called a lap dissolve) is a type of film transition in which one shot fades over another. The terms fade-out (also called fade to black) and fade-in are used to describe a transition to and from a blank image. This is in contrast to a cut, where there is no such transition. A dissolve overlaps two shots for the duration of the effect, usually occurring between the last shot of one scene and the first shot of the next. Generally, the use of a dissolve is to indicate that time has passed or location has changed between the two scenes. Dissolves may also be used to signify the start of a flashback or to depict montages, exposition setups, dream sequences, altered mental states, or celebrations.

== Creation of effect ==
In film, the dissolve is created in a two step process, beginning with a two roll (often coined A&B rolls) assembly followed by the use of an optical printer controlling double exposure. The A&B roll assembly (often called checker-boarding) splits the negative onto two different roles (coined A and B) with shot 1 starting the A roll, followed by opaque black leader film, then shot 3. The B roll begins with opaque black leader film, then shot 2, black film, then shot 4. The A and B rolls of film can then be superimposed with use of an optical printer to create what we know today as the dissolve transition in film.

In linear video editing or live television production, the same effect is created by interpolating the voltages of two synchronized video signals. In non-linear video editing, a dissolve is done using video editing software, by interpolating gradually between the RGB values of each pixel of the image. The audio track optionally cross-fades between the soundtracks.

== Use ==
A dissolve from The Stranger, directed by Orson Welles, used to indicate a transition in time and place

Dissolves and cuts are used differently. A dissolve slowly transitions between shots or scenes and often signals a change in time or space. Conversely, a cut changes the perspective from which a scene is portrayed. It is as if the viewer suddenly and instantly moves to a different place, and can see the scene from another angle.

Fades and dissolves typically have a duration of 1 to 2 seconds (24–48 frames), though this may vary according to the preference of the director and editor. Short dissolves (6–12 frames) may be used to soften obvious hard cuts which may startle the viewer, or jump cuts.

The length of the dissolve may be dictated by the mood or pacing the director or editor wishes to create. For instance, in the opening sequence of Citizen Kane, the dissolves between the master shots are slow because of the pervading sense of morbidity Welles and his collaborators wished to create. In the "News on the March" (montage) sequence shortly afterwards, however, the dissolves are much shorter as the intention is to create a sense of vitality in the life of the still mysterious lead character and speed in the (supposedly) newsreel sequence.

Narratively, the dissolve is most used to signify a passage of time, change of location, or to indicate connection between consecutive shots or scenes. The dissolve may appear singularly, often to separate scenes, or in a group, forming its own scene. When grouped, the dissolve most frequently appears to depict meaningful changes in time or space or in montages, exposition setups, dream sequences, altered mental states, and celebrations.

Dissolves are most common in classic cinema (see continuity editing), but are now less often used. The device began to fall into disuse as filmmakers fell under the influence of the French New Wave directors and their innovative use of the jump cut and as the absence of a linear narrative became more common. It is also sometimes held that the effect was best utilized in monochrome cinematography, where gradations of gray are mixed rather than possibly incompatible color tones. The impact of television news reporting may also have resulted in the device losing any pretense of having a contemporary feel.

Although the dissolve technique became less widely used with the French New Wave of cinema, it has still been incorporated into later films. Stylistically, a dissolve can be used as a transition from one face to another, often to provide narrative context between characters or to indicate a change in time. In the film Saving Private Ryan, there is a transition from Matt Damon’s character on a battlefield in World War II to an older version of him from the same angle with a similar expression. This is an example of a dissolve from one face to another to depict the character changing over time.

Dissolves are usually kept to a minimum in most films and shows. Due mainly to stylistic tastes, it is very rare to see a shot which both begins and ends with a dissolve.

== See also ==
- Axial cut
- J cut
- L cut
- Match cut
- Morphing
- Wipe (transition)
- Sound transitions:
  - Crossfading
  - Fade (audio engineering)
- Georges Méliès
- Dissolve (Blend mode)
