= Apple box =

Wooden box used in film production

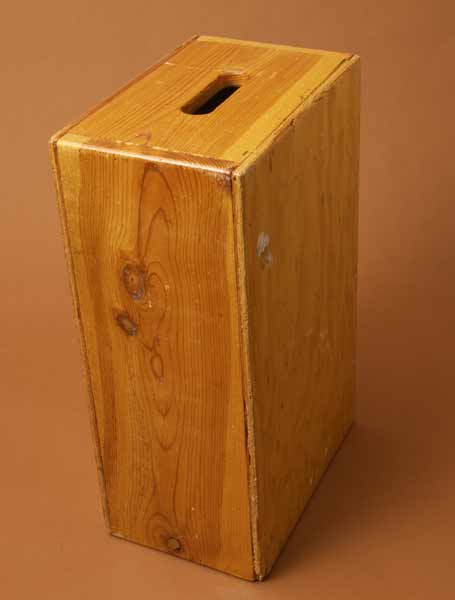
Full apple box, in New York position

Apple boxes are wooden boxes or crates of varying sizes with holes on each end used mainly in film production. These boxes are specialized pieces of equipment belonging to the grip department, and should not be confused with simple crates, other boxes, or boxes for apples.

== Uses ==
Used to temporarily prop up or support just about anything, apple boxes are one of the most ubiquitous and useful pieces of equipment on a film set. They can be used to prop up furniture and light stands, for leveling camera dolly track, or to provide temporary seats, workbenches, or stepladders.

The need often arises to make an actor appear taller, either because of their height, or to fit with the composition of a particular shot. In this use apple boxes are jokingly referred to as "man makers".

Originally with a forward opening in the box, they were first used for storage of small objects.

== Sizes ==
Apple box, full apple
20 by 12 by 8 inches (51 cm × 30 cm × 20 cm)
Half apple
19 3/4 by 12 by 4 inches (50 cm × 30 cm × 10 cm)
Quarter apple
19 3/4 by 12 by 2 inches (50 cm × 30 cm × 5 cm)
Eighth apple, pancake
19 3/4 by 12 by 1 inch (50 cm × 30 cm × 2.5 cm)

Nesting apple boxes fit the three smaller sizes into the full apple (which does not have the standard midway internal support crossbeam). To accommodate the smaller internal dimensions, the flat dimensions (length by width) of the half, quarter, and pancake boxes are only 18 1/2 by 10 inches (47 by 25 cm).

Half length "mini" apple boxes are now manufactured.

Mini apple box
10 by 12 by 8 inches (25 cm × 30 cm × 20 cm)
Mini half
10 by 12 by 4 inches (25 cm × 30 cm × 10 cm)
Mini quarter
10 by 12 by 2 inches (25 cm × 30 cm × 5 cm)
Mini pancake, or eighth
10 by 12 by 1 inch (25 cm × 30 cm × 2.5 cm)

Apple box sizes vary somewhat depending on manufacturer, but all sizes are designed to be fractions of the "full apple" size. Thus two half-apples exactly equal the size of a full apple, two quarter-apples equals one half-apple, and two pancakes equal one quarter-apple. This modular design is important as many applications require mixes of sizes.

== Position ==
When a grip is placing an apple box, others may be holding something heavy that will be placed on top of it. To avoid confusion and delays in those moments, terms developed to describe the position that an apple box should be placed in (i.e., which side of the apple box should be placed face-down). It is rare that these terms are used for anything other than the "full apple" size.

New York or "A"
Positioned so the apple box is tallest, like the tall buildings in New York, 20 inches (50 cm) high.
Texas/Chicago or "B"
Positioned so the apple box is resting on its longest narrow side, 12 inches (30 cm) high.
LA or "C"
Positioned so the apple box is flattest, 8 inches (20 cm) high.

Regional variations exist for the colloquial names of these positions. These include 1/2/3, New York/Chicago/LA, and Manhattan/Brooklyn/Queens.

== Basso blocks ==
Basso blocks are a stacking variant of conventional apple boxes. Their design gives the same elevation ability of apple boxes, but takes 66% less storage space. A full set of Basso blocks is equivalent to 12 half-apples. A set of half–Basso blocks is equivalent to 24 quarter-apples.

Elephant blocks are a three legged stable update to Basso blocks that allow 1 inch (2.5 cm) elevation increments.

== See also ==
- Motion picture terminology
