= Cutting on action =

Film and video editing technique

Example of a cut being made on the action

Cutting on action or matching on action refers to film editing and video editing techniques where the editor cuts from one shot to another view that matches the first shot's action.

A common example is a man walking up to a door and reaching for the knob. Just as his hand touches the knob, the scene cuts to a shot of the door opening from the other side.

Although the two shots may have actually been shot hours apart from each other, cutting on action gives the impression of continuous time when watching the edited film. By having a subject begin an action in one shot and carry it through to completion in the next, the editor creates a visual bridge, which distracts the viewer from noticing the cut or noticing any slight continuity error between the two shots.

A variant of cutting on action is a cut in which the subject exits the frame in the first shot and then enters the frame in the subsequent shot. The entrance in the second shot must match the screen direction and motive rhythm of the exit in the first shot.

== Examples ==
Japanese filmmaker Akira Kurosawa cut on action to avoid calling attention to the cuts. An example of this is his 1954 film Seven Samurai, where, when Shichirōji kneels to comfort Manzo, the film cuts on the action of kneeling. Kurosawa's approach to cutting on motion has since been widely adopted by many Hollywood blockbuster films, particularly in fight scenes.

Some films, like Alain Resnais's surreal Muriel ou Le temps d'un retour (1963), play with this technique. Cutting on action is used, instead of accentuating the continuity elements of the action, to trick and confuse the viewer. The director also plays with other aspects of continuity editing, such as subverting the 180 degree rule and shot/reverse shot.

== See also ==
- Continuity editing
- Match cut
- Motion picture terminology
