= Internal rhythm =

Pacing aspect of filmmaking

In filmmaking, internal rhythm is created by whatever appears or occurs within the shot of a moving picture. It can change within a scene and from scene to scene. For example, in Citizen Kane, the internal rhythm of the scene in which Kane, Leland, Bernstein, and the movers take over the offices of the Inquirer differs from the rhythm of the scene in which Kane demolishes Susan's bedroom or from the scene in which Kane and Susan spend an evening at home at Xanadu.

The scene in the newspaper office begins slowly and quietly but gradually speeds up until the action becomes frantic. The demolition of Susan's bedroom starts off at a slow pace, becomes chaotic, and then slows once more when Charles finds Susan's snow-scene paperweight. The rhythm of the scene between Kane and Susan at home is heavy and static, yet filled with tension. It represents a duration where the action unfolds like a dance.

== Elements used to establish internal rhythm ==
Movement of objects and people
a) the tempo of the movement, b) the direction of the movement on the screen, c) the pattern of the movement (balanced, staggered, flowing, chaotic, syncopated, etc.)
Lenses
the effect of a telephoto lens on movement is different from that of a wide-angle lens.
Lighting
Camera movement
the rhythm and pattern of a camera's movement is, of course, influential. The movement can be slow, jerky, fast, restless, static, prowling, etc.
Camera distances
aloof, distant positioning can minimize the effect of movement or create a point of view from which we can appreciate movement or patterns of movement. Close-ups tend to heighten the impact of movement.
The solidity, shape, texture, and color
fire, smoke, massive arches, masses of people, mountains, deserts, stark red or quiet green objects create different effects. Composition, of course, is vitally important: solid, triangular patterns create a stability that an airy pattern of leaves does not.
Sound
it is debatable whether sound is internal or external rhythm.

== See also ==
- External rhythm
