= Sound report =

Report by sound mixer during film production

A sound report is a filmmaking term for a sheet of paper created by the sound mixer to record details of each file recorded during filming. A sound report is arranged in a table format, where the rows represent each file recorded, which at the least would contain columns for noting down the scene, slate or shot and take number, and a wider column for remarks about the particular take's sound. A report would typically note the title of the production, the date, the audio roll or tape that the file is recorded on, tape speed or sample rate, bit depth, and timecode information. More detailed reports may include the location, production company, director, the model of the mixer, recorder and microphones used on the day, the names of the sound crew, and columns indicating which tracks were used for any given take.

The sound mixer will fill out the report during or after each take, noting down if there were any wild lines, any extraneous or unwanted sounds, and any other information useful in determining the take's sound quality. The sound mixer may in some way mark takes that were good, or of high quality, to provide a simple visual indicator as to the best takes. The report will be given to the post production department, where it would be used to determine which takes are of the best quality without having to listen through to every one, so the film editor and/or dialogue editor can more easily determine where alternate good takes may be found to replace those of lower sound quality, and can quickly determine how the sound needs to be edited.
