= Baby plate =

A baby plate is a flat piece of wood especially designed to meet the needs of film makers on the sets. Baby plates are useful for holding small fixtures. They also allow for the quick mounting of fixtures in places where clamps cannot be used. Baby plates can be nailed on any surface. They are available in three different sizes.

- 3 in - 6 to 12 in - Right angle
