= Spotlight (theatre lighting) =

Theatre lighting

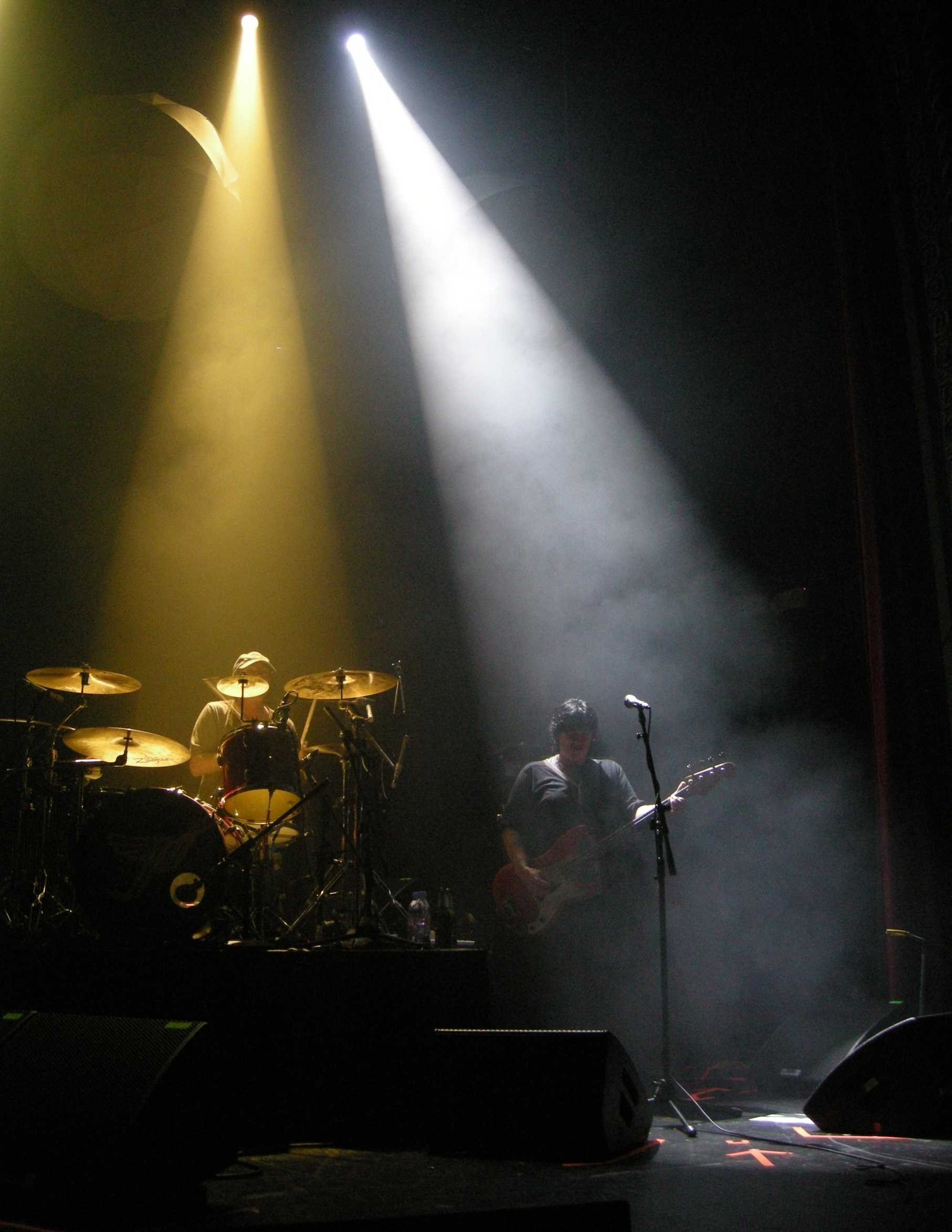
Spotlights in use at a music performance

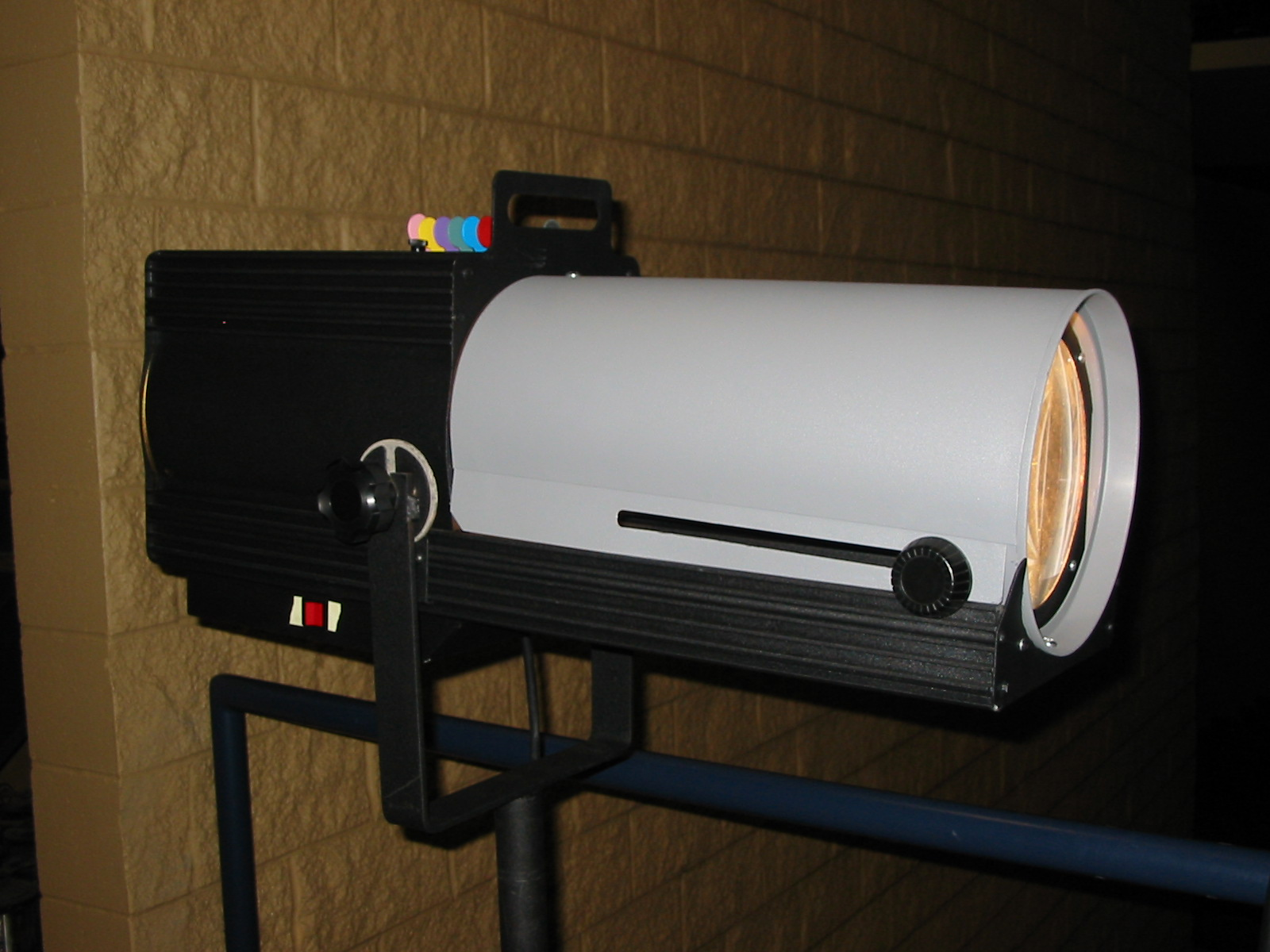
A spotlight

A spotlight (or followspot) is a powerful stage lighting instrument which projects a bright beam of light onto a performance space. Spotlights are controlled by a spotlight operator who tracks actors around the stage. Spotlights are most commonly used in concerts, musicals and large-scale presentations in which highlighting a specific mobile individual is critical. Spotlights are sometimes located overhead on catwalks. In some theatres, they may also be located in the control booth or purpose-built "spot booths" in addition to the catwalk.

Spotlights may be arranged in a variety of patterns for coverage. For example, they can be located to the back or rear of a theater and aimed at the stage in front of them. This location can become problematic due to the audience being distracted by fan noise or the spot operator speaking into their headset microphone. In circus and sports, spotlights may be arranged around the facility covering both sides and the ends. In a concert setting, they may be in a front of house (FOH) position, while other positions may have the spotlight upstage used as back or top light. Some concerts use truss spots on a truss downstage, but closer than catwalk spots in an amphitheater-style catwalk layout. In other places, spot locations are at the mercy of the architect who designed the space.

Characteristics of a typical spotlight include:

- A strong light source, often a high-intensity discharge lamp with a high colour temperature.
- A lens which can be manually focused.
- A manual device to change the intensity of the beam, especially when an HID source which can not be electronically dimmed, is used.
- An "iris" to adjust the size of the spot/angle of the beam.
- A color magazine or "boomerang" consisting of several gel frames which can be swung in front of the beam.
- Some sort of physical sight to assist in aiming is sometimes added onto the lamp by the operator.

Some spotlights can be fitted with colourchangers to colour the beam or gobo holders to create a variety of effects. Most spotlights can be fitted with colour gels.

== Godspot ==
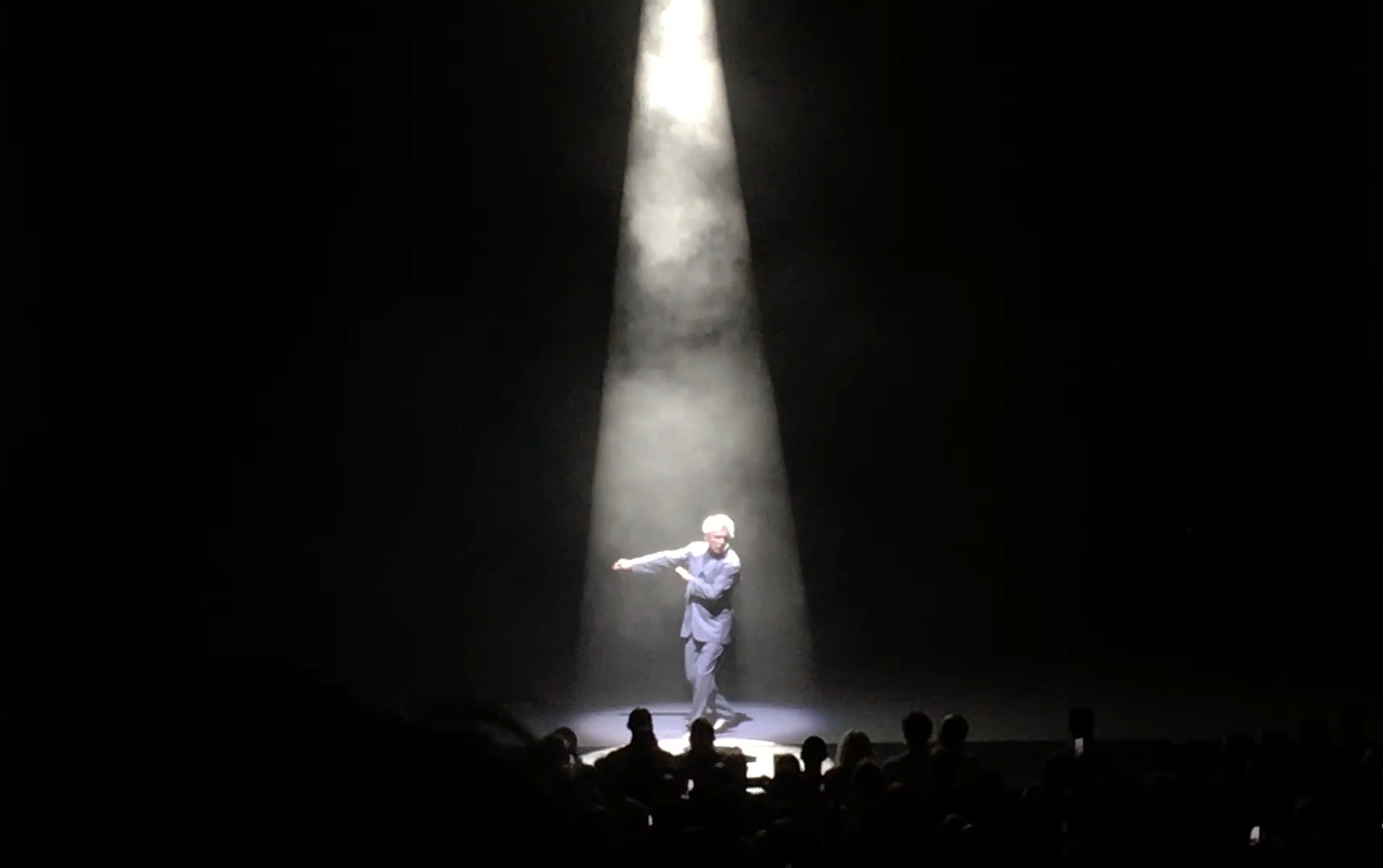
Singer David Byrne lit by a single white spotlight from above

A godspot is an effect used in stage lighting for the theatre. The effect is created using a powerful spotlight (usually a beam projector, Fresnel, or ERS) placed directly above the stage at an angle of less than 10 degrees from vertical, i.e. almost straight down. The light has no color gel, and is usually directed downwards to hit a single actor or a huddled group of actors with a bright white light.

The effect is meant to evoke an understanding that God is present and directly watching the scenes proceeding below. Use of the godspot in this fashion often foreshadows a deus ex machina ending. The godspot can also be used at times to suggest an angelic nature of a particular character.

Sometimes this effect is used to simulate an alien abduction.

== Gallery ==
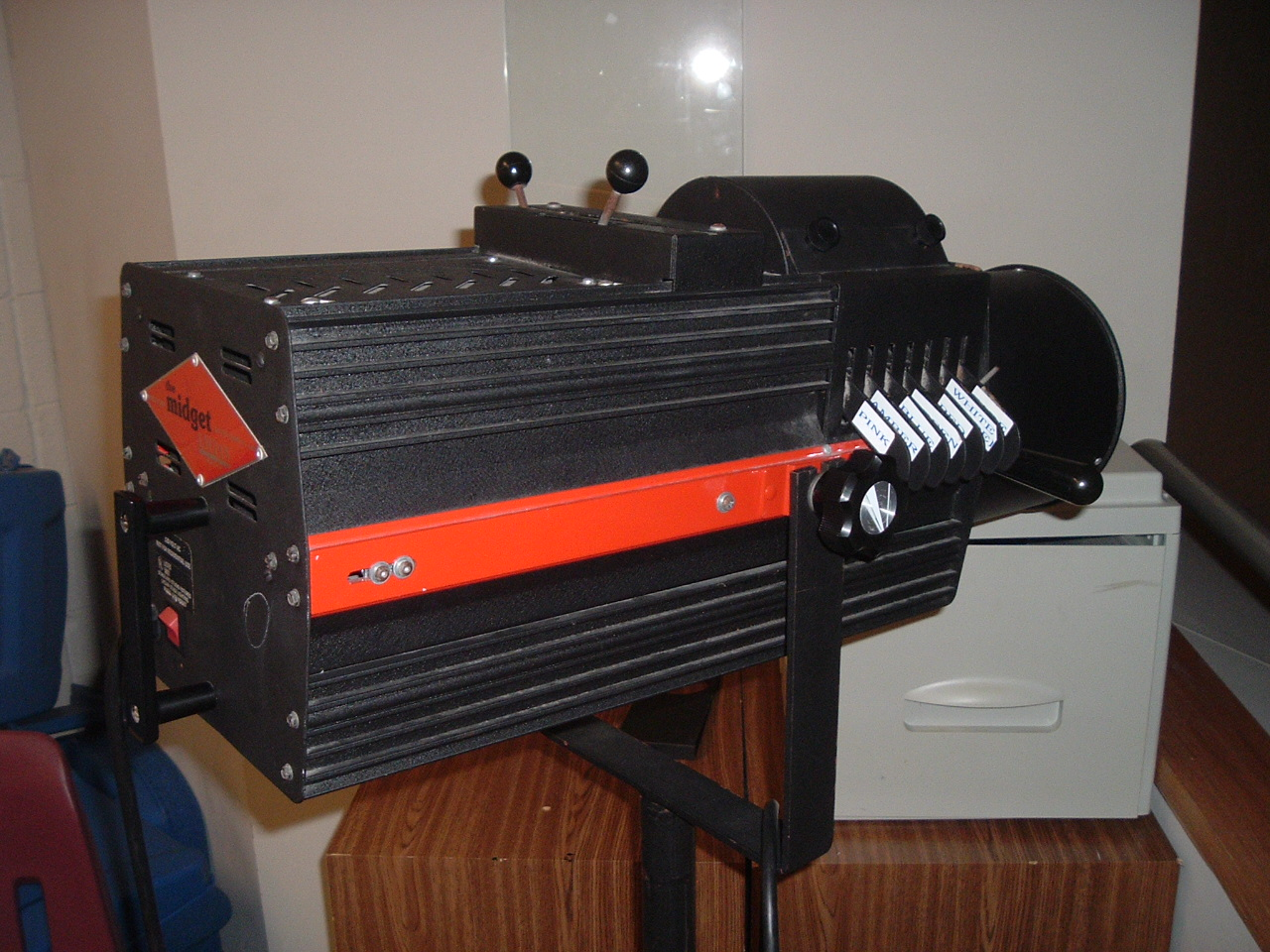
A spotlight

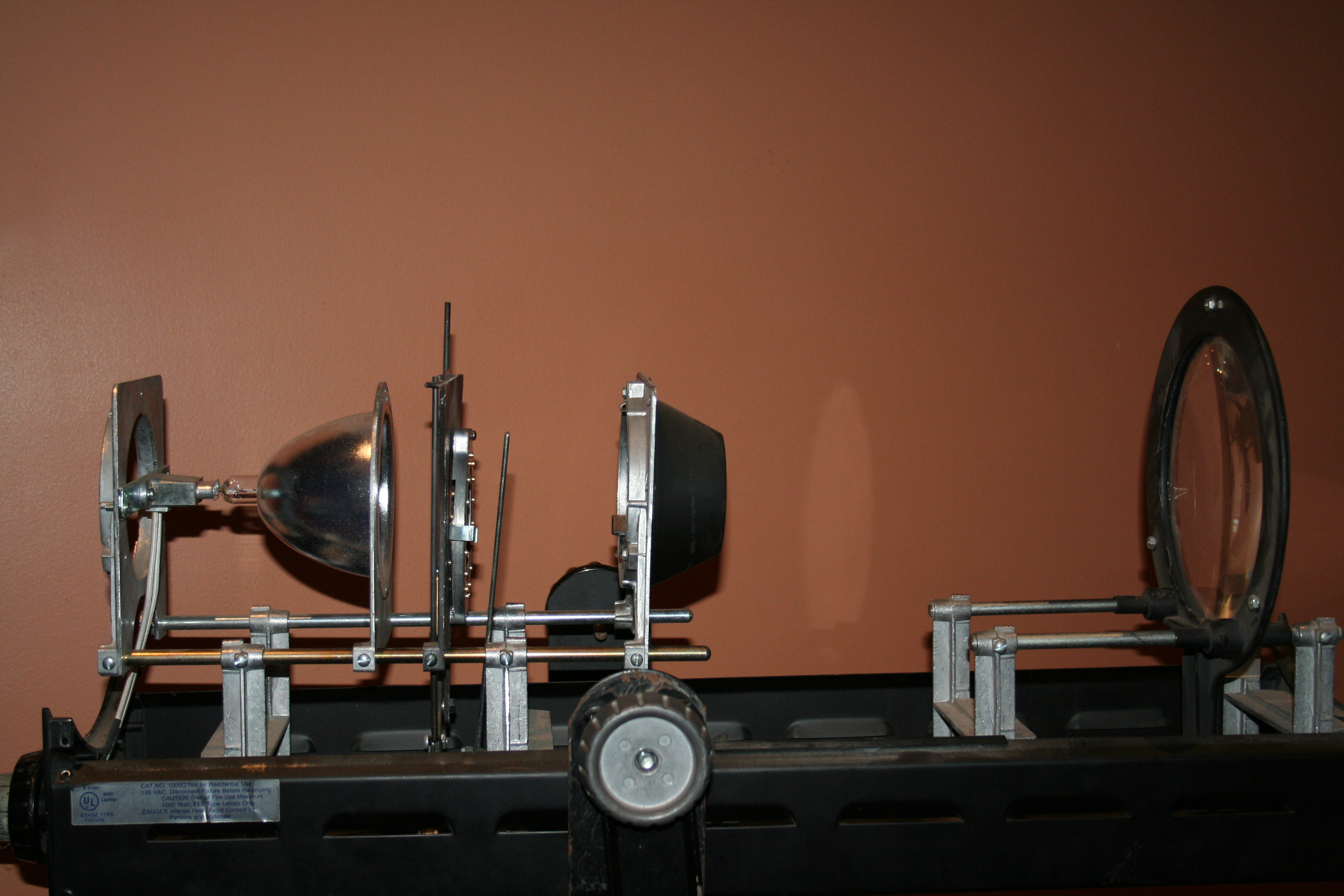
The optics of a spotlight

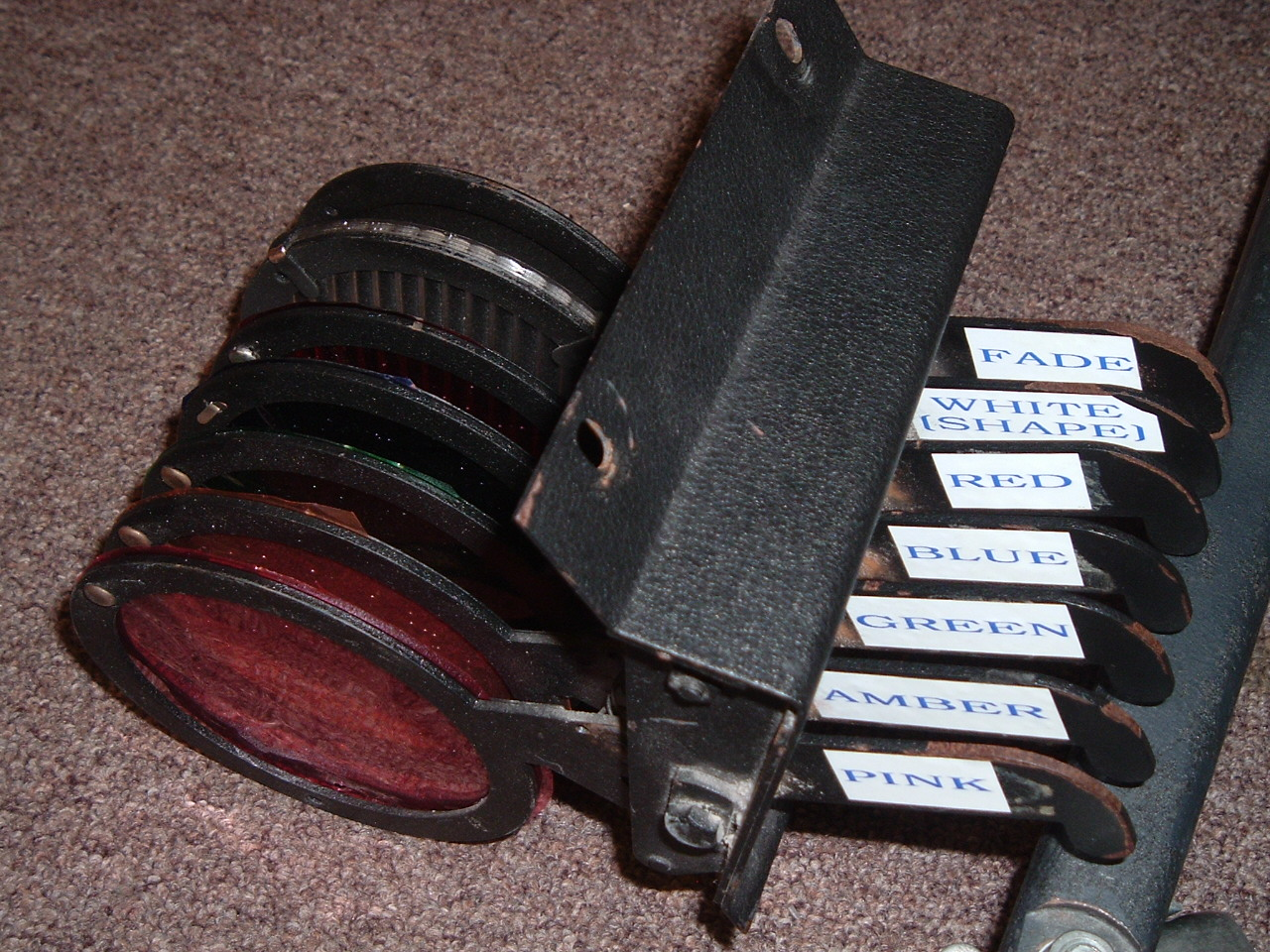
The color changer or "boomerang" from a spotlight

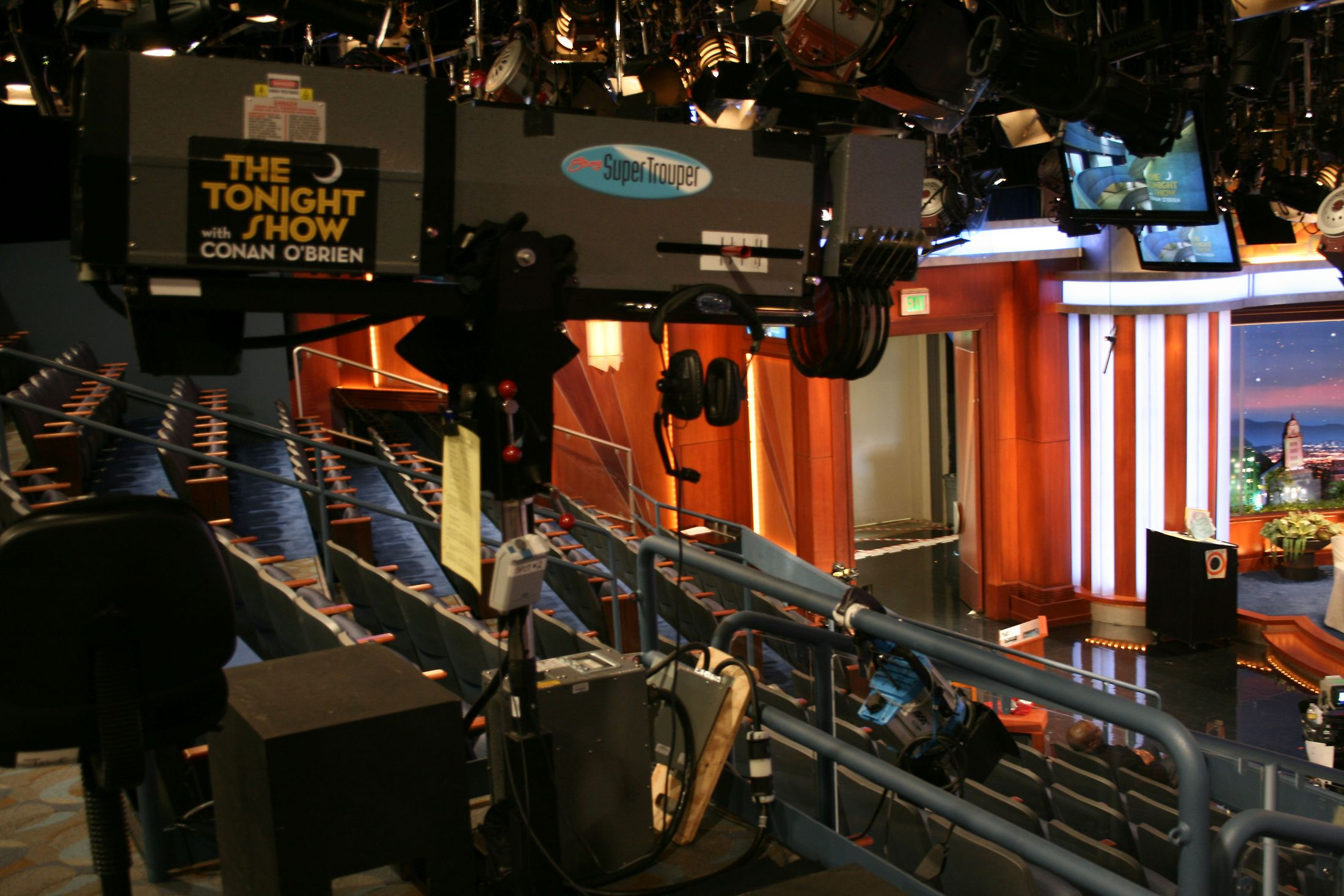
Super Trouper spotlight with color changer
