= Film transition =

Technique by which scenes or shots of a film are combined

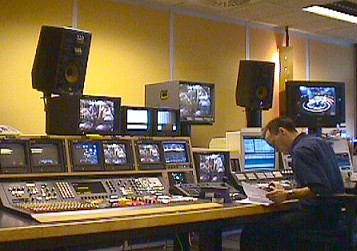
A video editing suite

A film transition is a technique used in the post-production process of film editing and video editing by which scenes or shots are combined. Most commonly this is through a normal cut to the next shot. Most films will also include selective use of other transitions, usually to convey a tone or mood, suggest the passage of time, or separate parts of the story. These other transitions may include dissolves, L cuts, fades (usually to black), match cuts, and wipes.

== Shot transitions ==
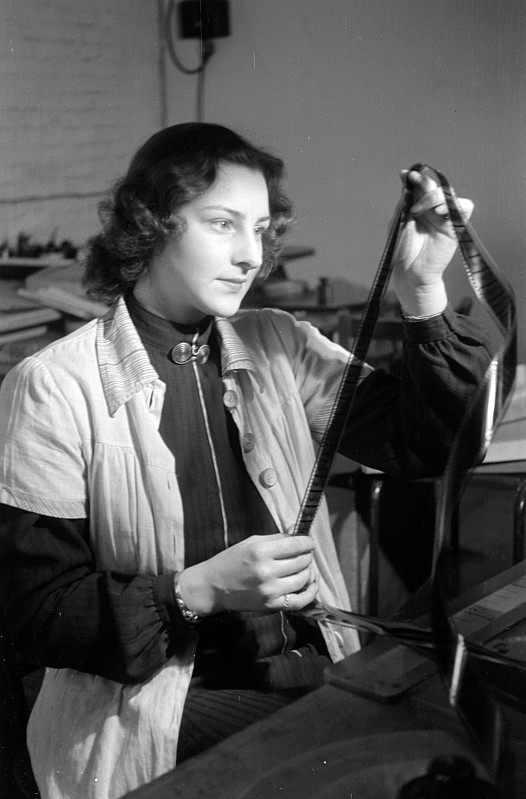
A film editor at work in 1946.

Every film today, whether it be live-action, computer generated, or traditional hand-drawn animation is made up of hundreds of individual shots that are all placed together during editing to form the single film that is viewed by the audience. The shot transition is the way in which two of these individual shots are joined together.

=== Caesura ===
Principally a literary term denoting a rhythmical pause and break in a line of verse. In poetry, the caesura is used to diversify rhythmical progress and thereby enrich accentual verse.

==== Some applications ====
The term first gained significance in motion-picture art through the editing experiments of Sergei Eisenstein. In applying his concept of montage as the "collision of shots", Eisenstein often included caesuras – rhythmical breaks – in his films. The acts of The Battleship Potemkin (1925) are separated by caesuras that provide a rhythmical contrast to the preceding action. The intense, frenetic action of the mutiny, for example, is followed by the lyrical journey of a dinghy to the shore. The three Burt Bacharach musical sequences in Butch Cassidy and the Sundance Kid (1969) provide contrasting caesuras that separate the major actions of the film. Several intense action sequences in Master and Commander (2003), including a raging sea storm and fight scenes, are followed by caesuras – quiet, scenic interludes that are often accompanied by melodic cello music.

=== Continuity ===
The continuity is the development and structuring of film segments and ideas so that the intended meaning is clear, and the transitions employed to connect the film parts. In a more specific meaning, "continuity" refers to the matching of individual scenic elements from shot to shot so that details and actions, filmed at different times, will edit together without error. This process is referred to as "continuity editing". To maintain continuity within sequences, the editor will often cut on character action so that the scene flows together without noticeable jump-cuts (see below). Lapses in the flow of action can be avoided by transition and cutaway devices (see below). Music and sound are often utilized to provide a sense of continuity to a scene or sequences that may contain a variety of unmatched shots taken in different locations. For example, in Rocky (1976), the song "Getting High" served as a continuity device during the highly fragmentary sequence showing Rocky in the various training preparations for his title fight. The song connected the numerous brief shots so that they appeared as a single and complete unit within the film.

=== Cut ===
The cut is the most basic and common type of transition. In a cut, one image on the screen is instantly replaced by another, often with a change in camera angle. Shot A ends abruptly and shot B begins. Cuts can be classified into different types, as detailed below.

==== Cutaway ====
A shot edited into a scene that presents information that is not a part of the first shot. The cutaway shot is usually followed by a return to the original shot, and is often used to condense time in a scene by eliminating undesired action or to cover a loss of continuity in the action. For example, a series of shots of a woman smoking a cigarette may not match correctly in editing because of the varied lengths of cigarette ash from shot to shot. A cutaway to a mantel clock, ticking away the time, would provide enough distraction to cover the loss of continuity. Or the cutaway of the clock could be inserted between a shot of the woman smoking a cigarette and one of the woman reading a book. The cutaway would permit the editor to advance the action in time.

==== Cut-in ====
A shot that presents material in a scene in greater detail, usually through a close-up shot. A cut-in isolates and emphasizes an element of the mise-en-scène for dramatic or informational value. Each progressive movement through the shot sequence, from long shot to close-up, constitutes a form of cut-in. A cut-in made from a long shot to a big close-up can have a startling effect on the viewer because of this immediate magnification. This technique is frequently an editing method of suspense films.

Related, there is the insert shot, which is a shot containing visual detail that is inserted into a scene for informational purposes or to provide dramatic emphasis. A close-up view of printed material in a book, intercut as a character reads, is a type of informational point-of-view insert. The intercutting of a close-up view of a gun resting on a desk within a room where a violent argument is occurring constitutes a type of dramatic insert. Detail shot is another term for insert short.

==== Contrast cut ====
An editor can strategically cut to juxtapose two subjects. For instance, somebody dreaming of a beautiful field of flowers, shot A, may suddenly wake up inside a burning building, shot B. The sound would be serene and peaceful in shot A, and suddenly loud and painful in shot B. This contrast between peace and chaos is intensified through the sudden transition.

==== Dynamic cutting ====
The dynamic cutting is an approach to film editing in which the cutting from one shot to the next is made abruptly apparent to the viewer. In matched cutting or invisible editing, the cuts are not as obvious to the viewer because these approaches adhere to continuity procedures designed to hide the edit -for instance, cutting on action. Dynamic cutting, on the other hand, is self-conscious and will often startle the viewer by moving abruptly in time or space or by rapid cutting within a scene for expressive as well as narrative purposes. Bob Fosse's All That Jazz (1979), Richard Rush's The Stunt Man (1980), and Oliver Stone's JFK (1991) and Natural Born Killers (1994) employed dynamic cutting extensively. Dynamic cutting is a featured editing element in the films of Quentin Tarantino, from Reservoir Dogs (1992) to Django Unchained (2012).

==== Direct cut ====
Related to the dynamic cutting, the direct cut is an instantaneous change of shots, usually to a new locale or time frame, and executed without an optical transition device. The direct cut serves to replace, dynamically, one shot with another.

==== L cut ====
An L Cut is an editing technique that results in a cut occurring at a different time for audio than for video. For example, we may hear characters' voices a few seconds before we see them on film. In order to achieve this effect, the editor had to make an L-shaped cut on the filmstrip itself. Even today with the advent of computerized non-linear editing systems, the digital representation of the film in the program still takes on this L-shaped appearance.

==== Match cut ====
The match cut joins together two pieces of film that contain two similarly shaped objects in similar positions in the frame. One of the most famous examples of this is the edit in 2001: A Space Odyssey where the bone thrown by a prehistoric ape cuts to a futuristic space station.

==== Invisible cut ====
Like the match cut, the invisible cut attempts to join two shots with similar frames together. The invisible cut, however, is designed to completely hide the transition from the audience. The audience can deduce a cut has occurred, but it would have a hard time pinpointing the exact moment. For example, if a character walks towards the camera, completely covering it, the cut is introduced when the back of the character is shown walking away. The invisible cut can also be hidden by a whip pan, entering/leaving a very dark or very light environment, or by an object crossing the screen.

==== Parallel editing cut ====
For example, imagine an action scene where a villain is chasing the hero of the film. To spend the entire chase scene trying to keep both the hero and the villain in the frame at the same time will become very difficult and un-engaging after a while. A better way to approach this problem is through the use of parallel cutting. In this example, the scene would consist of several shots of the hero running in one direction, and some shots of the villain running in the same direction. Perhaps the hero looks back, out of frame, at his pursuer. At this point, the editor would insert a shot of the villain. Neither character occupies the same screen space, yet the audience still understands that one is chasing the other.

==== Jump cut ====
A jump cut is usually the result of a continuity error, and not a stylistic choice by the director. But the director can purposely use it to create an effect of passing time without showing the whole event take place. A jump cut occurs when a cut, designed to act merely as a camera angle change (less than 30-degrees), reveals a continuity discrepancy between the two shots. For instance, if a character has their hand over their mouth in a medium shot, and not in their close-up, this little detail, which probably was not noticed on set, is now painfully obvious to the viewers.

=== Defocus transition ===
The defocus transition is a type of transition accomplished by rolling the lens focus until the scene becomes blurred. Passage of time within a scene can be suggested by refocusing the shot after alterations are made in the scene: change of costume, lighting, and other continuity elements. The defocus device has also been frequently employed in transitions to dream or fantasy sequences.

=== Fade in/out ===
A fade occurs when the picture gradually turns to a single color, usually black, or when a picture gradually appears on screen. Fade ins generally occur at the beginning of a film or act, while fade outs are typically found at the end of a film or act.

==== Dissolve ====
A dissolve transition between two still images

Like the fade, a dissolve involves gradually changing the visibility of the picture. However, rather than transitioning from a shot to a color, a dissolve is when a shot changes into another shot gradually. Dissolves, like cuts, can be used to create a link between two different objects, a man telling a story, and a visual of his story, for instance.

==== Ripple dissolve ====
A ripple dissolve is a type of transition characterized by a wavering image that is usually employed to indicate a change to flashback material, commonly a character's memory of an event. Sometimes the ripple dissolve is used as a transition to an imagined event or action. A series of three ripple dissolves appeared in Mamma mia! (2008) as Donna (Meryl Streep) discovers her three former lovers in the attic of her Greek villa. The brief ripple dissolves transport each man visually back in time to reveal their 1960's "hippy", "love children" appearances as Donna remembers them.

=== Washout ===
The washout is an optical transition used for editing purposes that is similar to the fade. Unlike the fade-out, where the images fade to black, in a washout the images suddenly start to bleach out or to color until the screen becomes a frame of white or colored light. A new scene will then follow.

Also, the washout is the most extreme form of overexposure, which is the act of exposing each frame of film to more light or for a longer period of time than would be required to produce a "normal" exposure of the same subject. There is little or no visible detail in the highlights - the bright areas of the picture - and images appear bleached, more or less washed out. The effect is accomplished by directing the camera at a bright light source that would wash out most, if not all, of the frame area, or by having the effect processed in the film laboratory. While in 2014 some motion-picture directors were still opting for film emulsion-based photographic materials rather than digitally retrieved imagery, the number doing so was rapidly decreasing.

==== Some applications ====
Ingmar Bergman made extensive use of the washout in this psychological film Cries and Whispers (1972). Bergman varied the technique for both the purposes of transition and for continuing his expressive use of color in the picture. The washouts would bring a single, rich color to the end of a scene to symbolize the emotions and psychological passions at work in the story. Washouts were also effectively employed in the fantasy sequences of Catch-22 (1970). Monster (2003) concludes with a washout as Aileen Wuornos (Charlize Theron) leaves the courtroom after she is sentenced to death. Similarly, a slow washout to white brings Hours (2012) to a tearful but happy conclusion in a shot where a father (Paul Walker) cuddles his premature daughter, whose life he has saved in a New Orleans hospital without electricity while Hurricane Katrina rages.

=== Wipe ===
A wipe involves one shot replacing another, traveling from one side of the frame to another. Think of a vertical line passing from the right side of the frame to the left. On the left side of this line, we have shot A, and on the right side of this line is shot B. When this line reaches the left edge of the frame, shot B will completely fill the scene, and the transition is complete. This example describes a vertical line wipe, though this is but one type of wipe.

Another common type of wipe uses objects in the scene, rather than an invisible vertical line. One interesting application of this creates the illusion of a camera passing through the ceiling of the bottom floor of a multi-story house to the ground of the floor above. In this case, shot A would consist of the camera rising to the ceiling, and shot B would have the camera rising from the ground. A wipe transition gives the impression the camera is passing between the floors of a house.

==== Natural wipe ====
A transition technique accomplished by an element within the mise-en-scène rather than by a laboratory process. A character or an object is brought to the lens of the camera and wipes away the scene by completely blocking or blurring the frame. A closing door often serves as a natural wipe. The natural wipe is followed by a new scene. A head-on, tail-away transition is a type of natural wipe that is used to end one scene and to reveal another.

==== Iris wipe ====
The wipe shape can also be circular through the use of the camera's iris. By closing the iris, a blurry circle sweeps inwards to the middle of the frame, drawing attention to the subject occupying this center space.

=== Morph ===
Although not always confined to shot transitions, a morph can be thought of as a dissolve combined with a visual effect. Rather than simply blending the colors together, a morph is able to gradually reshape an object to become another object, creating a much stronger connection than a simple dissolve can provide. One famous example of this can be found towards the end of the film Saving Private Ryan. The face of young private Ryan (played by actor Matt Damon) is slowly morphed back to an older private Ryan (played by Harrison Young), while at the same time the background is dissolved from a besieged city during World War 2, into a graveyard set in the modern day; there is no doubt in the audience's mind about the two men being one and the same.

=== Sound effects ===
==== Overlapping sound ====
An overlapping sound is usually a sound effect or speech that continues briefly from one shot into the next. Overlapping sound may be a sound advance, where a speech or sound effect in an incoming shot is heard briefly in the outgoing shot. Overlapping sound may be used to connect, dynamically, two separate pieces of dramatic action or to enhance the pace of story development.

==== Sound advance / sound bridge ====
It is the advancement of a sound, to be heard in a new shot or scene, taken from the end of the preceding scene. Sound advances, common in modern films, are actually combined with cut transitions to pull the action of the story forward in a dynamic manner.

===== Some applications =====
Alfred Hitchcock fairly well patented the sound advance in his 1929 classic Blackmail. A young woman (Anny Ondra) wandering the streets of London in shock after killing a man, comes upon a drunk lying on the pavement, his arm extended in the same manner as the artist just murdered by the woman in his studio apartment. The image of the arm seems to precipitate a scream from the young woman. A cut, however, reveals that the scream is coming from a landlady who has just discovered the dead artist's body in his apartment. The sound advance also has conceptual, satirical, and dramatic possibilities. In Five Easy Pieces (1970), the unexpected sound of a bowling ball rolling down a bowling lane is heard in the final seconds of a scene in a motel room where Jack Nicholson has taken a girlfriend. Just as the ball strikes the tenpin, a cut is made to a new scene where Nicholson is bowling with the woman. The combined sound advance and the cut transition together serve as a sexual metaphor.

==== Asynchronous sound ====
An asynchronous sound is a term for sound that has not been synchronized with the screen image. Asynchronous sound also includes aesthetic use of sound for expressive purposes. Because of the composite nature of film art, the element of sound (music, dialogue, sound effects) is highly manipulative. The sounds of a clucking chicken can be juxtaposed with a shot of a ranting politician for satirical effect.

A popular variation of asynchronous sound in contemporary filmmaking has been in the use of sound advances in the editing scenes. An asynchronous sound advance can occur when the editor shows the face of a character screaming in horror, and instead of using the natural sound of the character's horrified voice, inserts the piercing, shrill siren of a police car, to be seen in the following scene. The device of the sound advance combines asynchronous and synchronous sound in a uniquely cinematic way. Francis Ford Coppola made extensive use of combined synchronous-asynchronous sound in the baptism scene of The Godfather (1972). Near the end of the film, shots of a solemn religious ceremony are juxtaposed with scenes of a vendetta occurring simultaneously in various parts of the city. The sounds of the grand church music and priestly intonations of the baptismal rite continue uninterrupted as the gunmen carry out their tasks. Through the use of synchronous-asynchronous sound, and visual crosscutting, an ironic, psychological linking of past, present, and future occurs. Asynchronous sound can serve to create irony between sound and image, to satirize and parody dramatic situations, and to link separate moments of time in expressive ways.

=== Psychological time ===
Psychological time is a term referring to the use of filming devices that, in the continuity of a motion-picture narrative, suggest not chronological time but time as it is perceived by a character's mind. A dissolve (see above) for example, most commonly reveals a passage of time when used within an ongoing scene. The dissolve, by tradition, serves to include intervening time and action. If however, a dissolve rather than a cut is used in a continuing uninterrupted action, its unconventional placement carries psychological implications. Subjectively inspired psychodramas by experimental filmmakers, such as Meshes of the Afternoon (1943) by Maya Deren, often exploit the psychological dissolve for a mind's-time effect. Psychological time can also be suggested by the repeated use of a piece of action. The condemned traitor's final, desperate effort in An Occurrence at Owl Creek Bridge (1962) to reach his wife is conveyed in psychological time by a repeated telephoto shot of the man running down the road to his home. He appears suspended in time and place, which in fact he is; shortly after these shot repetitions the viewer discovers that the traitor's entire flight has been a fantasy revealed through an extended use of psychological time. A particularly engaging and sometimes bewildering use of psychological character perception occurs in Memento (2000), a film about a man who is searching for his wife's murderer. The search is complicated by the fact that the man has lost his short-term memory. Events come and go on the screen without their meaning being clear at first revelation. Psychological time is a distinguishing element in Shane Carruth's 2013 experimental science-fiction film Upstream Color. Avoiding a well-made narrative structure, the plot of Upstream Color centers on a man and woman who are targets of parasitic engineering and whose lives dissolve into mental and psychological disarray. Time is rendered in abrupt, discontinuous fragments, with daily reality intermingling with mental apparitions and abstract imagery.
