= L cut =

Film editing technique in which audio cuts after the picture cuts

In film editing, an L cut is a type of split edit in which the audio from the preceding scene overlaps the picture from the following scene, so that the audio cuts after the picture, and continues playing over the beginning of the next scene.

The name of the cut refers to the shape of audio and video pieces of the second of two scenes cut together when it was done on analog film. This creates a shape similar to the letter "L" on the timeline, with the main body representing the video from the previous clip and the foot of the "L" representing the continuing audio. The L-cut frequently appears in interviews, documentaries, and dialogue-heavy video scenes.

== See also ==
- J cut
- Jump cut
- Match cut
- Split edit
