= Slow cutting =

Film editing technique

Slow cutting is a film editing technique characterized by frequent lengthy shots. Though it depends on context, it is estimated that any shot longer than about fifteen seconds will seem rather slow to many modern-day viewers, especially those who are accustomed to mainstream Western movies, where slow cuts are uncommon.

Slow cutting can be used to establish a mood before fast cutting injects energy. Slow cutting may also be used in scenes of calm or reflection, and filmmakers can use slow cutting to slow down the pace, just as the second movement of a symphony or concerto typically does.

== Films and television ==
The Stranger (1946), with slow cutting resulting in a lengthy shot

Notable films that use the slow cutting technique are: Citizen Kane, Russian Ark, 2001: A Space Odyssey, The Prisoner of Zenda, Snow White and the Seven Dwarfs, The Adventures of Robin Hood, Mr. Smith Goes to Washington, Grapes of Wrath, His Girl Friday, Mildred Pierce, Treasure Island, Darby O'Gill and the Little People, Psycho, The Omen, Rambo: First Blood Part II, Robocop, and A Clockwork Orange.

American director Ken Burns used slow cutting for his television documentary series about the Vietnam War.

== Directors ==
Most of the early films directed by Michelangelo Antonioni use slow cutting. Other directors known for the technique include: George Marshall, John Stahl, Edmund Goulding, George Cukor, John Farrow, and Ernst Lubitsch.

== See also ==
- Long take
- Motion picture terminology
- Fast cutting
- Slow cinema
