= Fast cutting =

Film editing technique

A fast-cut advertisement: most cuts are under 3 seconds

Fast cutting is a film editing technique which involves several consecutive shots of a brief duration (e.g. 3 seconds or less). It can be used to quickly convey much information, or to imply either energy or chaos. Fast cutting is also frequently used when shooting dialogue between two or more characters, changing the viewer's perspective to either focus on the reaction of another character's dialog, or to bring to attention the non-verbal actions of the speaking character.

One famous example of fast cutting is the shower scene in Alfred Hitchcock's film Psycho (1960).

More recent examples include the can-can scene in Baz Luhrmann's Moulin Rouge! (2001).

The film Mind Game (2004) makes extensive use of fast cutting to convey hundreds of short scenes in the space of 15 minutes.

In Run Lola Run (1998), fast cutting is used to quickly tell stories about minor characters to show how the casual actions of the protagonists have profound impact on what happens to them.

In various moments in the Saw movies, fast cutting is used frequently during trap scenes, which represent their frantic struggle to escape the trap.

Director Michael Bay makes extensive use of fast-cutting in many of his feature films. He uses the technique most prominently during action sequences, in which it is used to make the action more energetic and intense.

The film Whiplash (2014) makes an extensive use of fast-cutting, primarily during the musical sequences and the scenes where there is tension between the two protagonists.

== Hip hop montage ==
A hip hop montage is a subset of fast cutting used in film to portray a complex action through a rapid series of simple actions in fast motion, accompanied by sound effects. The technique was first given its name by Darren Aronofsky, who used the technique in his films Pi (1998) and Requiem for a Dream (2000) to portray drug use. According to the director's commentary of Requiem for a Dream, the hip hop montage is used in film as a sample is used in hip hop, with a few moments of film or video, respectively, repeated throughout the work for effect. The technique is derived from the hip hop culture of the 1990s and jump cuts first pioneered in the French new wave.

It was used earlier in Bob Fosse's Cabaret (1972) and All That Jazz (1979), and Paul Thomas Anderson's Boogie Nights (1997). Guy Ritchie also used the technique in Snatch (2000) to portray transcontinental travel. The work of Edgar Wright, most notably in his collaboration with Simon Pegg (Spaced, Shaun of the Dead, Hot Fuzz, and The World's End) uses the technique for comedic effect.

Joseph Gordon-Levitt used the technique extensively in Don Jon (2013) to portray the main character's habits.

== See also ==
- Slow cutting
- kinestasis
