= Wipe (transition) =

Film transition in which a shot replaces another by traveling across the screen

Examples of various wipe transitions

In filmmaking, a wipe is a type of film transition where one shot replaces another by travelling from one side of the frame to another or with a special shape. If the wipe proceeds from two opposite edges of the screen toward the center or vice versa, it is known as a barn door wipe (named for its similarity to a pair of doors opening or closing).

== Types ==
The following are specific types of wipes:

- An iris slow is a wipe that takes the shape of a growing or shrinking circle. It has been frequently used in animated short films, such as those in the Looney Tunes and Merrie Melodies cartoon series, to signify the end of a story. When used in this manner, the iris wipe may be centered on a certain focal point and may be used as a device for a "parting shot" joke, a fourth wall-breaching wink by a character, or other purposes. Optional graphic (i.e. rips) occasionally are overlaid to achieve a certain effect like an iris-tearing transition.
- A star wipe is a wipe that takes the shape of a growing or shrinking star and is used to impart a sense of "extra specialness" or "added value". An example of the "star wipe" can be seen in the Guiding Light opening sequences of the 1980s. This convention was considered overused during that time period and is now generally thought to be somewhat out of date. The use was parodied in Aqua Teen Hunger Force Colon Movie Film for Theaters and The Simpsons.
- A heart wipe is a wipe that takes the shape of a growing or shrinking heart, and is used to impart a sense of "love" or "friendship". The heart wipe is still used in wedding, graduation, and bar mitzvah videos, among others, as it has now passed from stylistic into the realm of standard convention, though many people consider it tacky.
- A matrix wipe is a patterned transition between two images. The matrix wipe can be various patterns such as a grid, stars, etc.
- A clock wipe is a wipe that sweeps a radius around the center point of the frame to reveal the subsequent shot, like the sweeping hands of an analog clock. Because of this similarity, it is often used to indicate that time has passed between the previous shot and the next shot. One of the TV shows that used the effect is Regular Show. The Red Green Show also makes frequent use of this wipe type, featuring an animated roll of duct tape, and accompanied by the loud "yanking tape off a roll" sound effect.
- The most common uses of the wipe effect is the invisible wipe, where a camera follows a person into another room by tracking parallel to the actor. As the wall passes in front of the camera, the editor has the option of using a wipe to be able to choose any other matching take of the same scene. It is also commonly used in quick camera pans in action sequences, to make a cut invisible. Such wipes can be impossible to see in the finished film. A good example of this wipe can be seen in the movie Das Boot when the director, Wolfgang Petersen, uses it to pan between two occupied U-boat pens, even though the production had only one U-boat for filming.
- Some extremely effective (and expensive) wipes were used in the otherwise very low-budget Laurel and Hardy short film Thicker than Water. For each of the scene changes in this film, either Laurel or Hardy or both of them would seize a curtain or some other object at the edge of the frame and move it across the screen. The opening frames of the next scene were optically printed onto this object, so that—when the object entirely filled the screen—the movie had "wiped" the last shot of the previous scene and begun the first shot of the next.

The earliest known example of a wipe was George Albert Smith's film Mary Jane's Mishap of 1903.

George Lucas made frequent use of wipes in his Star Wars films, inspired by a similar use of wipes by Akira Kurosawa.

Since at least the 1980s, the American game show The Price is Right has made extensive use of wipes, usually from contestants to prizes. In the early-to-mid 1980s, an iris slow was used twice during the opening sequence, transitioning from the shot of the host entrance to the camera panning down from the studio lights, and then from that camera shot to one of the host. Around 1987, this was changed to a star wipe, which the show would end up using for years until 2010.
