= Match cut =

Film editing technique

In film, a match cut is a cut from one shot to another in which the composition of the two shots are matched by the action or subject and subject matter. For example, in a duel, a shot can go from a long shot on both contestants via a cut to a medium closeup shot of one of the duellists. The cut matches the two shots and is consistent with the logic of the action. This is a standard practice in film-making, to produce a seamless reality-effect.

== Wider context ==
Match cuts form the basis for continuity editing, such as the ubiquitous use of match on action. Continuity editing smooths over the inherent discontinuity of shot changes to establish a logical coherence between shots. Even within continuity editing, though, the match cut is a contrast both with cross-cutting between actions in two different locations that are occurring simultaneously, and with parallel editing, which draws parallels or contrasts between two different time-space locations.

A graphic match (as opposed to a graphic contrast or collision) occurs when the shapes, colors and/or overall movement of two shots match in composition, either within a scene or, especially, across a transition between two scenes. Indeed, rather than the seamless cuts of continuity editing within a scene, the term "graphic match" usually denotes a more conspicuous transition between (or comparison of) two shots via pictorial elements. A match cut often involves a graphic match, a smooth transition between scenes to create an element of metaphorical (or at least meaningful) comparison between elements in both shots.

A match cut contrasts with the conspicuous and abrupt discontinuity of a jump cut.

== Notable examples ==
The iconic match cut in 2001: A Space Odyssey, from a bone-club to a satellite in orbit.

Stanley Kubrick's 1968 film 2001: A Space Odyssey contains a famous example of a match cut. After a hominid discovers the use of bones as a tool and a weapon, he throws one triumphantly into the air. As the bone spins in the air, there is a match cut to a much more advanced tool: an orbiting satellite. The match cut helps draw a connection between the two objects as exemplars of primitive and advanced tools respectively, and serves as a summary of humanity's technological advancement up to that point.

Michael Powell and Emeric Pressburger's A Canterbury Tale (1944) is a predecessor for the 2001: A Space Odyssey match cut in which a fourteenth-century falcon cuts to a World War II aeroplane. The sense of time passing but nothing changing is emphasised by having the same actor, in different costumes, looking at both the falcon and the aeroplane.

Another early example is Orson Welles's Citizen Kane (1941), which opens with a series of match dissolves that keeps the titular character's lit window in the same part of the frame while the cuts take viewers around his dilapidated Xanadu estate, before a final match dissolve takes viewers from the outside to the inside where Kane is dying.

A match cut occurs at the end of Alfred Hitchcock's North by Northwest. As Cary Grant pulls Eva Marie Saint up from Mount Rushmore, the cut then goes to him pulling her up to his bunk on the train. The match cut here skips over the courting, the marriage proposal, and the actual marriage of the two characters who had for much of the film been adversaries. Another Hitchcock film to employ the use of a match cut is Psycho. Just after Marion Crane is murdered in the "shower scene", the camera shows blood flowing down the drain of the tub, then cuts (dissolves) to a shot of Marion's eye.

== See also ==
- Cutting on action
- Film transition § Invisible cut
- Jump cut
- Split edit
