= Film grammar =

Special terms on filming

In film, film grammar is defined as follows:

1. A frame is a single still image. It is analogous to a letter.
2. A shot is a single continuous recording made by a camera. It is analogous to a word.
3. A scene is a series of related shots. It is analogous to a sentence. The study of transitions between scenes is described in film punctuation. Film punctuations can also be intra scene & shot.
4. A sequence is a series of scenes which together tell a major part of an entire story, such as that contained in a complete movie. It is analogous to a paragraph.
5. A film is a series of sequences or sometimes just a sequence where the film consists of a single sequence.

The term film grammar is best understood as a creative metaphor, since the elements of film grammar described above do not stand in any strict relation of analogy to the components of grammar as understood by philology or modern linguistics.

D. W. Griffith has been called the father of film grammar. Griffith was a key figure in establishing the set of codes that have become the universal backbone of film language. He was particularly influential in popularizing "cross-cutting"—using film editing to alternate between different events occurring at the same time & between different time periods within the timeline of the given film —in order to build suspense or for any other relevant purpose(s). He still used many elements from the "primitive" style of movie-making that predated classical Hollywood's continuity system, such as frontal staging, exaggerated gestures, minimal camera movement, and an absence of point of view shots. Some claim, too, that he "invented" the close-up shot for filming.

Credit for Griffith's cinematic innovations must be shared with his cameraman of many years, Billy Bitzer. In addition, he himself credited the legendary silent star Lillian Gish, who appeared in several of his films, with creating a new style of acting for the cinema.

== See also ==
- Grammar
