= Pick-up (filmmaking) =

Minor shot to add to previously done footage

In filmmaking, a pick-up is a small, relatively minor shot, filmed or recorded after the fact to augment footage already shot. When entire scenes are redone, it is referred to as a re-shoot or additional photography.

== On set ==
During principal photography, the director may choose to ask for another take (meaning that every movable object and person in the scene returns to their starting positions and the entire shot is recorded all over again), or may ask for a pick-up shot of only the faulty portion of an otherwise satisfactory take. In the latter situation, the script supervisor is expected to record in their notes that a pick-up shot was called for (so the film editor can understand and correctly edit the resulting footage) and also help prompt or "cue" the relevant actor by reading the last line before that actor's line. It is increasingly common for a director to not immediately call "cut" after a blooper, but instead leave the camera rolling and call for a pick-up, which makes pick-up shots an exception to the normal rule that a script supervisor does not cue actors while the camera is rolling.

When a pick-up shot is created in this manner to be edited into the middle of an existing shot, the script supervisor must ensure the director also creates "bridge shots" to bridge what would otherwise look like jarring jump cuts from the master shot to the pick-up shot and back. These can be close-ups, cutaways, or shots of the same scene from different angles.

== Later editing ==
Pick-up shots and re-shoots can also occur after principal photography is complete—after continuity, logic, or quality issues are identified during the film editing process. In other words, they can occur months after the sets have been struck, the costumes and props have been stored, and all the cast and most of the crew have moved on to other projects. In deciding whether to proceed, the director and producer must carefully balance the substantial expense of reuniting key cast and crew members on set, against whether pick-ups or re-shoots are absolutely necessary to fix plot holes (or worse) in the final cut.

Pick-ups and reshoots themselves can pose significant continuity issues. For example, if the original costumers or makeup artists are unavailable (or if rented costumes and wigs were returned and original makeup supplies were entirely used up), then their replacements must study their predecessors' work, and precisely match whatever was used during the original film shoot.

== See also ==
- B-roll
