= Screen direction =

Direction objects appear to be moving

Screen direction is the direction that actors or objects appear to be moving on the screen from the point of view of the camera or audience. A rule of film editing and film grammar is that movement from one edited shot to another must maintain the consistency of screen direction in order to avoid audience confusion. Continuity editing is an essential rule that filmmakers follow to push their narrative forward in a navigable manner.

"Camera left" or "frame left" indicates movement towards the left side of the screen, while "camera right" or "frame right" refers to movement towards the right side of the screen. "Foreground" refers to the apparent space close to the camera (and thus to the audience), and "background" refers to the apparent space in the distance away from the camera and the audience. A majority of films will track from left-to-right rather than right-to-left. Some theorists believe simply controlling the direction of the shot can control the reactions of the audience. Another theory suggests it is due to right-hand dominance of the general population, i.e. left-to-right movement is more "natural" for the audience. This can go as far as making characters that move left-to-right good, and characters moving right-to-left evil.

== Examples ==
As an example of screen direction in use, if an actor is shown in one shot walking from screen left to screen right and then is shown in the next shot to be moving in the opposite direction (screen right to screen left), the audience will assume that the actor has changed direction and is walking back to where he started (in the absence of obvious contextual or environmental cues).

If the shot shows him again moving from screen left to screen right (as in the first shot), the audience will assume that the actor is continuing his previous movement and extending it to apparently cover a greater distance even if that is purely a fabrication of editing.

Another example would be if two characters are shown in a medium shot, say from the waist up, looking at each other, it is generally established that one is on the left of screen and the other on the right. The one on the left looks right to the other character and vice versa. When the editor cuts to a close shot of a person, it would be disorienting if the character looked the other way. The audience would assume that the character is looking at something else.

== Coverage ==
In the coverage of the scene, it is customary in film technique to be sure that screen direction is maintained. In a close up, the environmental cues are at a minimum.

It is the responsibility of the director, cameraman, and script supervisor on the set to maintain consistency of screen direction so that later during editing, the myriad short pieces of film can be properly assembled by the editor into a coherent film that tells the story intended.

== Usage ==
One of the keys to maintaining screen direction is the 180-degree rule, which cuts a horizontal line through the frame. Actors are then filmed from only one side of the axis, maintaining the orientation of the space for the viewer. This can be manipulated specifically to create a shift in perspective. Depending on the context, disrupting the typical line of sight can be an effective way to show a sense of chaos.

Avant-garde, experimental, and some independent film and video productions often deliberately violate screen direction rules in order to create audience disorientation or ambiguity. However, unless it is done very skillfully, violation of screen direction can appear to the audience to be the result of filmmaker ineptitude rather than experimentation.

Making use of this rule can have a significant psychological impact on the audience. For instance, creating anticipation in a shot. Filmmakers will use foreshadowing via filming angles. They might have two characters run into each other from opposite directions, flipping the standard 180-rule. If the director wanted to create suspense over someone being followed, they would need to maintain continuity between the direction the characters are moving on screen.
