= Classical Hollywood cinema =

Style of filmmaking

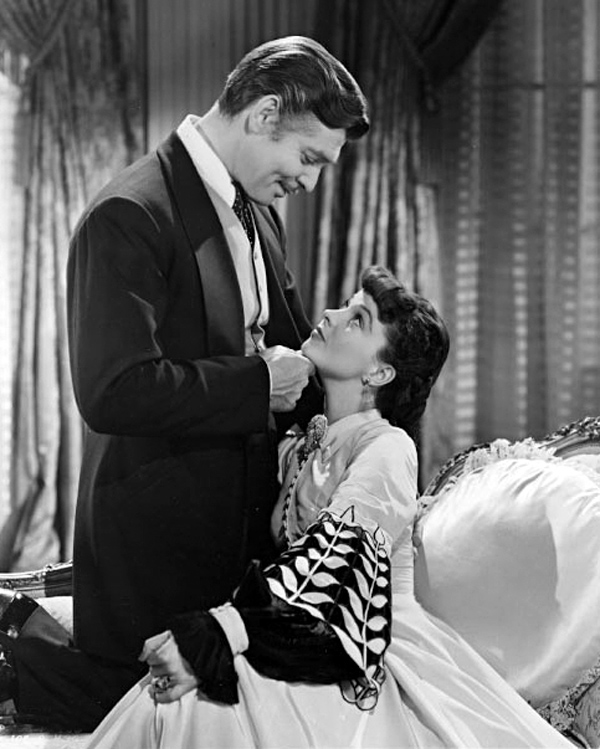
Publicity shot for film classic Gone with the Wind (1939), starring Clark Gable and Vivien Leigh

In film criticism, classical Hollywood cinema is both a narrative and visual style of filmmaking that first developed in the 1910s to 1920s during the later years of the silent film era. It then became characteristic of United States cinema during the Golden Age of Hollywood from 1927, with the advent of sound film, until the 1960s and the arrival of New Hollywood productions such as Bonnie and Clyde and The Graduate. During the intervening forty years, it was the most powerful and pervasive style of filmmaking worldwide. Similar or associated terms include classical Hollywood narrative, Old Hollywood, and classical continuity.

== History ==
=== Silent era and emergence of the classical style ===
For millennia, the only visual standard of narrative storytelling art was the theatre. Since the first narrative films in the mid-late 1890s, filmmakers have sought to capture the power of live theatre on the cinema screen. Most of these filmmakers started as directors on the late 19th-century stage, and likewise, most film actors had roots in vaudeville (e.g. the Marx Brothers) or theatrical melodramas. Visually, early narrative films had adapted little from the stage, and their narratives had adapted very little from vaudeville and melodrama. Before the visual style which would become known as "classical continuity," scenes were filmed in full shot and used carefully choreographed staging to portray plot and character relationships. Editing technique was extremely limited, and mostly consisted of close-ups of writing on objects for their legibility.

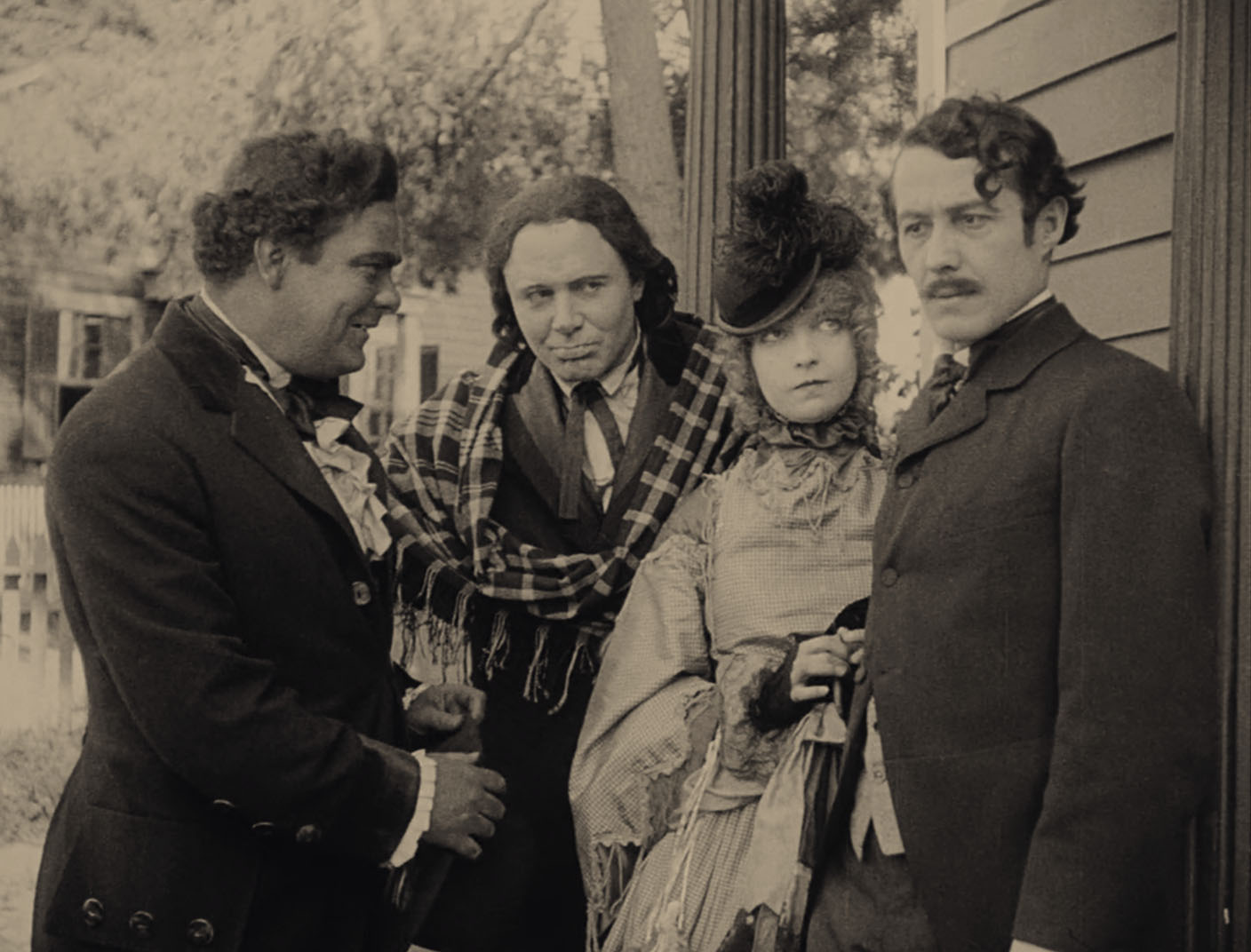
Still from the silent film The Birth of a Nation (1915), starring Lillian Gish (second from right)

Though lacking the reality inherent to the stage, film (unlike the stage) offers the freedom to manipulate apparent time and space, and thus create the illusion of realism – that is temporal linearity and spatial continuity. By the early 1910s, filmmaking was beginning to fulfill its artistic potential. In Sweden and Denmark, this period would later be known as the "Golden Age" of the film; in the United States, this artistic change is attributed to filmmakers like D. W. Griffith finally breaking the grip of the Edison Trust to make films independent of the manufacturing monopoly. Films worldwide began to noticeably adopt visual and narrative elements which would be found in classical Hollywood cinema. 1913 was a particularly fruitful year for the medium, as pioneering directors from several countries produced films such as The Mothering Heart (D. W. Griffith), Ingeborg Holm (Victor Sjöström), and L'enfant de Paris (Léonce Perret) that set new standards for the film as a form of storytelling. It was also the year when Yevgeni Bauer (the first true film artist, according to Georges Sadoul) started his short, but prolific, career.

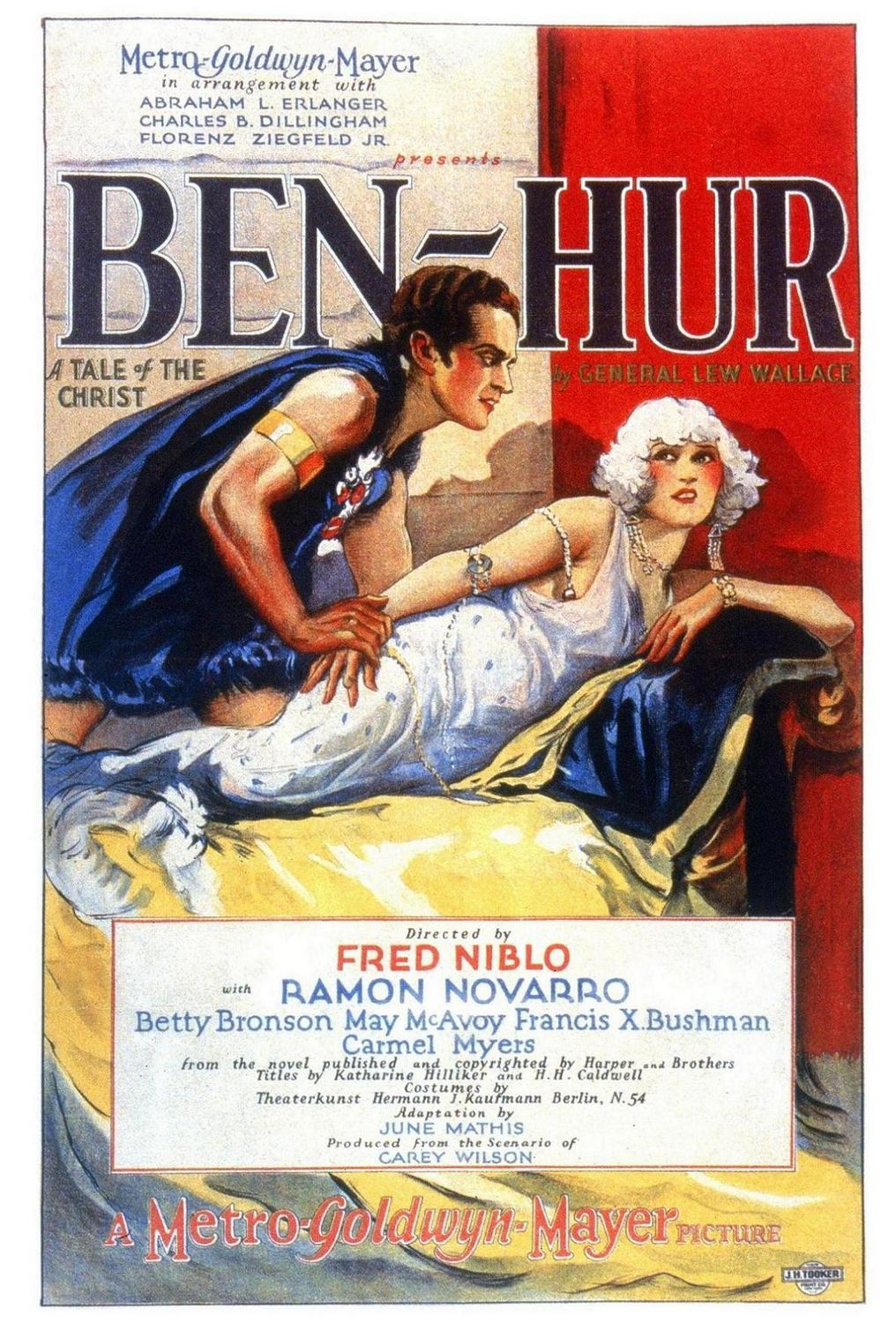
Theatrical release poster for Ben-Hur: A Tale of the Christ (1925)

In the world generally and United States specifically, the influence of Griffith on filmmaking was unmatched. Equally influential were his actors in adapting their performances to the new medium. Lillian Gish, the star of film short The Mothering Heart, is particularly noted for her influence on on-screen performance techniques. Griffith's 1915 epic The Birth of a Nation, also starring Gish, was ground-breaking for film as a means of storytelling – a masterpiece of literary narrative with numerous innovative visual techniques. The film initiated so many advances in United States cinema that it was rendered obsolete within a few years. Though 1913 was a global landmark for filmmaking, 1917 was primarily a United States one; the era of "classical Hollywood cinema" is distinguished by a narrative and visual style which began to dominate the film medium in America by 1917.

=== Start of the sound era and Golden Age of Hollywood ===
The narrative and visual style of classical Hollywood developed further after the transition to sound-film production. The primary changes in American filmmaking came from the film industry itself, with the height of the studio system. This mode of production, with its reigning star system promoted by several key studios, had preceded sound by several years. The Big 5 studios consisted of MGM, Warner Bros., 20th Century Fox, RKO, and Paramount. By the late 1920s, most of the prominent American directors and actors, who had worked independently since the early 1910s, had to become a part of the new studio system to continue to work. The Jazz Singer and Sunrise: A Song of Two Humans, both released in 1927, introduced synchronized sound to feature films, and Hollywood's box-office profits increased. By 1929, the silent age had definitively ended and been usurped by the "talkies".

Most Hollywood pictures from the late 1920s to 1960s adhered closely to a genre — Western, slapstick comedy, musical, animated cartoon, and biopic (biographical picture) — and the same creative teams often worked on films made by the same studio. For instance, Cedric Gibbons and Herbert Stothart always worked on MGM films; Alfred Newman worked at 20th Century Fox for twenty years; Cecil B. DeMille's films were almost all made at Paramount Pictures; and director Henry King's films were mostly made for 20th Century Fox. Similarly, actors were mostly contract players. Film historians note that it took about a decade for films to adapt to sound and return to the level of artistic quality of the silents, which they did in the late 1930s.

Many great works of cinema that emerged from this period were of highly regimented filmmaking. One reason this was possible is that, as so many films were made, not every one had to be a big hit. A studio could gamble on a medium-budget feature with a good script and relatively unknown actors. This was the case with Orson Welles' Citizen Kane (1941), which is regarded as one of the greatest films of all time. The apogee of the studio system may have been the year 1939, which saw the release of such classics as The Wizard of Oz; Gone with the Wind; The Hunchback of Notre Dame; Stagecoach; Mr. Smith Goes to Washington; Destry Rides Again; Young Mr. Lincoln; Wuthering Heights; Only Angels Have Wings; Ninotchka; Beau Geste; Babes in Arms; Gunga Din; The Women; Goodbye, Mr. Chips; and The Roaring Twenties.

Though the studio system dominated the first half of the Golden Age, the system came to an end in 1948 with the Paramount Decree. This marked the studios' loss of both their own movie theaters and the creative talent they had held under contract.

=== New Hollywood ===
The New Hollywood period of the 1960s to 1980s was influenced by the romanticism of the classical era, with filmmakers looking to take bigger and bigger risks in the pursuit of their specific interests amidst the general mistrust of authority. The French New Wave was influenced by it as well, particularly in terms of the beliefs held by artistic figures such as André Bazin that movies morally should serve as personalized projects by their directors to the degree that each and every one represents a director's individual vision. Classical Hollywood holds a foundational place in the identity and curation of film today and still impacts the style in which film makers decide to take.

Hollywood's movement shaped many new directors of the 1970s, who built upon classical conventions, adding more personal and experimental approaches to filmmaking. Martin Scorsese is a notable director who used new editing and character types.

== Stylistic conventions ==
The visual-narrative style of classical Hollywood cinema, as elaborated by David Bordwell, was heavily influenced by the ideas of the Renaissance and its resurgence of mankind as the focal point. It is distinguished at three general levels: devices, systems, and the relations of systems.

=== Devices ===
The devices most inherent to classical Hollywood cinema are those of continuity editing. This includes the 180-degree rule, one of the major visual-spatial elements of continuity editing. The 180-degree rule keeps with the "photographed play" style by creating an imaginary 180-degree axis between the viewer and the shot, allowing viewers to clearly orient themselves within the position and direction of action in a scene. According to the 30-degree rule, cuts in the angle that the scene is viewed from must be significant enough for the viewer to understand the purpose of a change in perspective. Cuts that do not adhere to the 30-degree rule, known as jump cuts, are disruptive to the illusion of temporal continuity between shots. The 180-degree and 30-degree rules are elementary guidelines in filmmaking that preceded the official start of the classical era by over a decade, as seen in the pioneering 1902 French film A Trip to the Moon. Cutting techniques in classical continuity editing serve to help establish or maintain continuity, as in the cross cut, which establishes the concurrence of action in different locations. Jump cuts are allowed in the form of the axial cut, which does not change the angle of shooting at all, but has the clear purpose of showing a perspective closer or farther from the subject, and therefore does not interfere with temporal continuity.

=== Systems ===
==== Narrative logic ====
Classical narration progresses always through psychological motivation, i.e., by the will of a human character and its struggle with obstacles towards a defined goal. This narrative element is commonly composed of a primary narrative (e.g. a romance) intertwined with a secondary narrative(s). This narrative is structured with an unmistakable beginning, middle and end, and generally there is a distinct resolution. Utilizing actors, events, causal effects, main points, and secondary points are basic characteristics of this type of narrative. The characters in classical Hollywood cinema have clearly definable traits, are active, and very goal oriented. They are causal agents motivated by psychological rather than social concerns. The narrative is a chain of cause and effect with causal agents – in classical style, events do not occur randomly.

==== Cinematic time and space ====
Time in classical Hollywood is continuous, linear, and uniform, since non-linearity calls attention to the illusory workings of the medium. The only permissible manipulation of time in this format is the flashback. It is mostly used to introduce a memory sequence of a character, e.g., Casablanca.

The greatest rule of classical continuity regarding space is object permanence: the viewer must believe that the scene exists outside the shot of the cinematic frame to maintain the picture's realism. The treatment of space in classical Hollywood strives to overcome or conceal the two-dimensionality of film ("invisible style") and is strongly centered upon the human body. The majority of shots in a classical film focus on gestures or facial expressions (medium-long and medium shots). André Bazin once compared classical film to a photographed play in that the events seem to exist objectively and that cameras only give us the best view of the whole play.

This treatment of space consists of four main aspects: centering, balancing, frontality, and depth. Persons or objects of significance are mostly in the center part of the picture frame and never out of focus. Balancing refers to the visual composition, i. e., characters are evenly distributed throughout the frame. The action is subtly addressed towards the spectator (frontality) and set, lighting (mostly three-point lighting, especially high-key lighting), and costumes are designed to separate foreground from the background (depth).

== AFI's list of the 50 greatest film stars ==
In 1999, the American Film Institute released a list ranking the top 25 male and 25 female greatest screen legends of American cinema. The only eligible film stars were actors who had begun their film career in or before 1950, or those who had begun their career after 1950 but had died before the list was created.

As of November 2026, Sophia Loren is the only living star who was recognized on this list.

- Chico Marx (1887–1961)
- Harpo Marx (1888–1964)
- Charlie Chaplin (1889–1977)
- Groucho Marx (1890–1977)
- Mary Pickford (1892–1979)
- Edward G. Robinson (1893–1973)
- Mae West (1893–1980)
- Lillian Gish (1893–1993)
- Buster Keaton (1895–1966)
- Fred Astaire (1899–1987)
- James Cagney (1899–1986)
- Humphrey Bogart (1899–1957)
- Spencer Tracy (1900–1967)
- Clark Gable (1901–1960)
- Gary Cooper (1901–1961)
- Marlene Dietrich (1901–1992)
- Claudette Colbert (1903–1996)
- Cary Grant (1904–1986)
- Greta Garbo (1905–1990)
- Henry Fonda (1905–1982)
- Joan Crawford (1904–1977)
- Laurence Olivier (1907–1989)
- Katharine Hepburn (1907–2003)
- John Wayne (1907–1979)
- Barbara Stanwyck (1907–1990)
- Bette Davis (1908–1989)
- Carole Lombard (1908–1942)
- James Stewart (1908–1997)
- Jean Harlow (1911–1937)
- Ginger Rogers (1911–1995)
- Gene Kelly (1912–1996)
- Vivien Leigh (1913–1967)
- Burt Lancaster (1913–1994)
- Orson Welles (1915–1985)
- Ingrid Bergman (1915–1982)
- Gregory Peck (1916–2003)
- Kirk Douglas (1916–2020)
- Robert Mitchum (1917–1997)
- William Holden (1918–1981)
- Rita Hayworth (1918–1987)
- Judy Garland (1922–1969)
- Ava Gardner (1922–1990)
- Lauren Bacall (1924–2014)
- Marlon Brando (1924–2004)
- Marilyn Monroe (1926–1962)
- Sidney Poitier (1927–2022)
- Shirley Temple (1928–2014)
- Audrey Hepburn (1929–1993)
- Grace Kelly (1929–1982)
- James Dean (1931–1955)
- Elizabeth Taylor (1932–2011)
- Sophia Loren (born 1934)

== See also ==
- Allied propaganda films of World War II
- Animation in the United States during the silent era
- Epic film
- Golden age of American animation
- Golden Age of Argentine cinema
- Golden Age of Mexican cinema
- Golden Age of Philippine cinema
- Golden Age of Radio
- Golden Age of Television
- Maximalist and minimalist cinema
- Modernism
  - Modernist film
  - Postmodernist film
- New Hollywood
- Poverty Row – B-movies during this era
