= Post-classical editing =

Style of film editing

Post-classical editing is a style of film editing characterized by shorter shot lengths, faster cuts between shots, and containing more jump shots and close-ups than classical editing characteristic of films prior to the 1960s.

== Origin ==
Prior to "post-classical editing" came classical editing. The first filmmakers merely filmed anything of interest or anything that amused them, continuing the shot until they got tired of it, or the film ran out. Edwin Porter, an employee of Thomas Edison discovered that by cutting shots together he was able to create a story. Later, D.W. Griffith further advanced the story telling tools Porter had developed. Griffith invented and popularized techniques that went on to define the basic grammar and narrative format of film. One of the techniques Griffith used in film that went on to impact film editing style is the invisible cut. The point of the invisible cut is to mask every cut, so the audience could forget they were watching a movie, and fully immerse themselves in the film. Invisible cuts are accomplished by matching the motion and making the switch between shots so smooth, making it look like one fluid motion, even if there is a change of shot composition. The Russian revolution started a film editing revolution as well. Melodrama films were disappearing and films that better represented real life were emerging. Propaganda films began to emerge. Certain cuts were used to foster a specific psychological and emotional affect from the audience members. These films, unlike the films of D.W. Griffith and others that embraced the invisible edit ideology, were constantly reminding the audience that they are in fact watching a movie. It was not long before American cinema began to absorb this style of montage.

== Characteristics ==
David Bordwell states, since 1960, US studio filmmaking has entered a "post classical" period, and that although it is argued this so-called "post-classical" period changed cinema to an incoherent narrative, films today still generally abide by the same principles as classical filmmaking. This post-classical style of editing, sometimes referred to as the "MTV Style" of video editing, which has become the visual language of American culture, is a way to edit using fast paced, very quick cuts between shots. Since the 1930s, the average shot length (ASL) in feature films has decreased from 8–11 seconds to 4.3-4.9 seconds. In the 1970s, ASL was between 5 and 8 seconds for feature films, dramas, musicals, romance while comedies often contained shorter ASLs. In the 1980s, ASLs in the double digit range virtually disappeared from feature films. Movies such as Top Gun, and Pink Floyd: The Wall (which were influenced by music videos) demonstrated ASLs from 3–4 seconds. Prior to 2006, this fast cut editing was most prevalently seen in fast paced action movies such as Michael Bay's Armageddon (1998 film) and Pearl Harbor (film) (2001), although they could be found (less often) in other genres of film as well. Editors who had once labored to preserve the illusion of continuous time and space were now fracturing time and space at will. These decreased shot lengths, and jump cuts led not only to a new visual style, but a new generation of narrative, a new style of storytelling.

One of the key differences between the post-classical, sometimes referred to as MTV style of editing, and the classic continuity way of editing is that the post-classical approach emphasizes less on time and space, than a film edited with continuity does. Instead of focusing on the character and the entire narrative, MTV style of editing or post-classical editing is focused on each individual set-piece In films from the 1940s and 1950s, less was left to the imagination. If someone was going from one room to the next, they were shown walking out of one door, closing that door, across the way opening the next door, walking through it and ending up on the other side. Today, it is not uncommon to show someone leaving one place, and arriving at the next, without showing precisely how the character did so. Essentially, it allows the narrative to jump from one scene to another, while still telling an understandable story. MTV Style is often considered disjointed, discontinuous, with a non-linear narrative. Films edited in this style are also multi-layered, meaning they contain more than one story, within a bigger story. This style of editing makes it possible to establish what is happening at two different locations within the same time frame. All of these components which differ from the classical editing style lead to a rhythm in the films which is much faster than that of a traditional narrative pace. Fast cutting is an editing style that can make a difference in emotional impact of a film on the audience. Editing film is a way to receive a specific reaction from the audience. By making certain cuts, an editor has the ability to manipulate the audience to have a certain reaction. The quick cutting characteristic of MTV, post-classical style of editing encourages a different reaction and emotional response from the audience than classical editing.

== Influence of MTV ==
The quick cuts which are characteristic of post-classical editing are something that younger generations have become accustomed to. The influence of MTV on the fast-paced, quick-cuts that can be seen in movies today is not something all filmmakers agree upon. Director Lawrence Kasdan states in the documentary titled The Cutting Edge: The Magic of Movie Editing, that the generation of people who grew up on MTV and 30 second commercials can process information faster, and therefore demand it. Editors were pushed in the direction of the quick cut style of editing in order to stay in tune with what their audiences wanted and demanded. Top Gun is an example of this. Jerry Bruckheimer and Don Simpson were listening to the demands of their audience and felt the quick pace and fast cutting was what the audience wanted. Some other feature-length films in which the MTV style of editing is used are Flashdance and Thelma & Louise. Jan-Patrick Stolpmann states that movies such as Flashdance and Footloose (1984 film) were actually feature length music videos based on the way their montages were edited. Martin Scorsese, whose films are more closely edited in the classical style of editing states: "I guess the main thing that's happened in the past ten years is that the scenes have to be quicker and shorter. Good Fellas is sort of my version of MTV... but even that's old-fashioned". Director Alexander Payne argues that MTV did not invent the idea of fast cutting. He points out that quick edits can be found in The Wild Bunch. For some who did not grow up with MTV, VH1, and short commercials, the fast cuts that are characteristic of post-classical editing can be too overwhelming, to the point of making the film not enjoyable.
