= 30-degree rule =

Basic film editing guideline

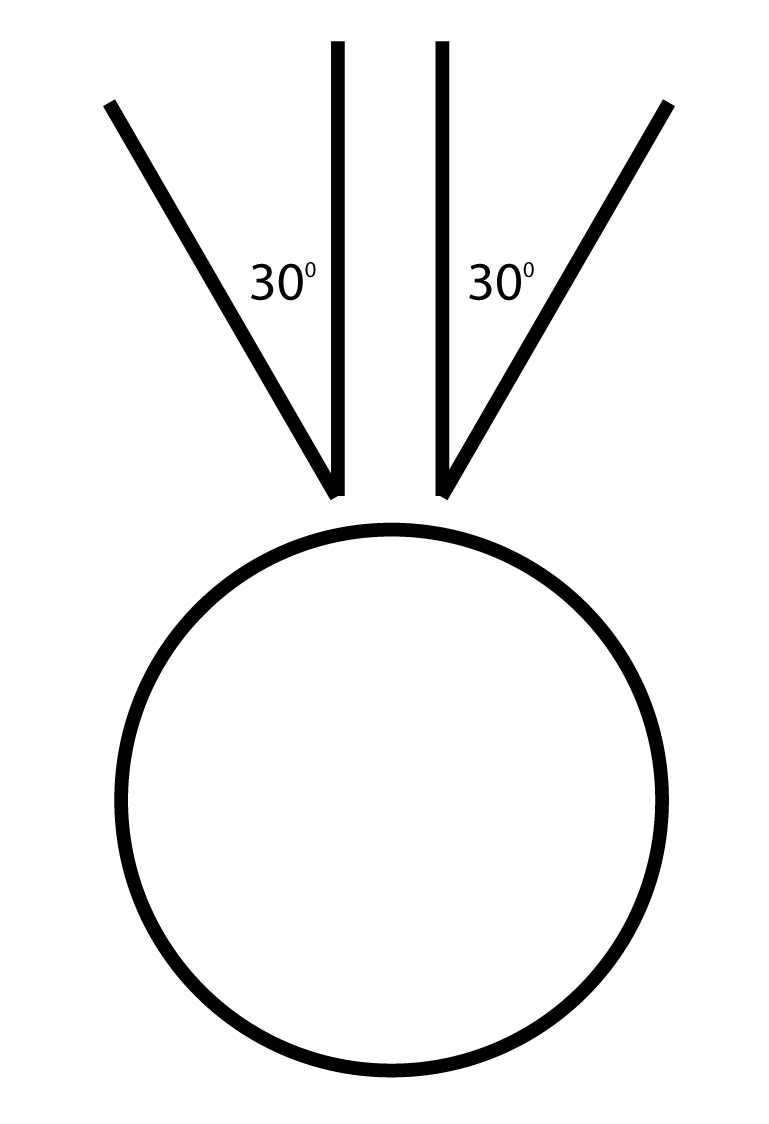
The relationship between 30 degrees and the binocular human experience.

The 30-degree rule is a basic film editing guideline that states the camera should move at least 30 degrees relative to the subject between successive shots of the same subject. If the camera moves less than 30 degrees, the transition between shots can look like a jump cut—which could jar the audience and take them out of the story. The audience might focus on the film technique rather than the narrative itself.

The 30 degree change of angle makes two successive shots different enough to not look like a jump cut. However, camera movement should stay on one side of the subject to follow the 180-degree rule.

A similar principle applies to changing the focal length of the lens; a change of less than 20 mm while keeping the same angle of view has a similar perception, and the 30 degree rule is often called the "20 mm/30 degree rule" for this reason. Although the axial cut does not follow the 30-degree guideline, effectively making it a specialized type of jump cut, its adherence to the 20mm rule has allowed it to gain an important place within classical continuity.

As Timothy Corrigan and Patricia White suggest in The Film Experience, "The rule aims to emphasize the motivation for the cut by giving a substantially different view of the action. The transition between two shots less than 30 degrees apart might be perceived as unnecessary or discontinuous—in short, visible." Especially in post-continuity editing, there are some cases where jump cuts are used in montage or for aesthetic effect, but generally filmmakers try to avoid them otherwise.

The 30 degree rule is a special case of a more general dictum that states that the cut is jarring if two shots are so similar in angle and distance that it appears there is no reason for the cut. In his book In The Blink of an Eye, editor Walter Murch states:

"[We] have difficulty accepting the kind of displacements that are neither subtle nor total: Cutting from a full-figure master shot, for instance, to a slightly tighter shot that frames the actors from the ankles up. The new shot in this case is different enough to signal that something has changed, but not different enough to make us re-evaluate its context."
