= Smash cut =

Film editing technique

A smash cut is a technique in film and other moving picture media where one scene abruptly cuts to another for aesthetic, comedic, narrative, or emotional purpose. To this end, the smash cut usually occurs at a crucial moment in a scene where a cut would not be expected, manipulating viewers' expectations by changing the order of a scene. To heighten the impact of the cut, a disparity in the type of scene on either side of the cut is often present, going from a fast-paced frenzied scene to a tranquil one, or going from a pleasant scene to a tense one, for example. Smash cuts are sometimes defined as a subtype of jump cut.

For example, a smash cut could be used in a murder scene: the killer brings a knife plunging down into his victim, and just before the blade pierces the skin, the scene is suddenly replaced with a non-violent use of a cutting edge, such as the chopping of vegetables. Smash cuts are often used when a character wakes up from a nightmare to simulate the jarring nature of that experience.

Smash cutting can also be used to comedic effect: for example, directly after a prediction is made, cutting to the future showing the prediction to have been humorously, and often outlandishly, wrong. One specific variety of smash cut, which depicts a given character resolutely declaring their intentions immediately before a cut to a scene depicting the character doing the exact opposite, is known in the United States as a Gilligan cut, so named for the TV show Gilligan's Island; and in the United Kingdom as a bicycle cut, so named for a scene from Last of the Summer Wine.

An example of a smash cut often hailed to be particularly funny occurs in Indiana Jones and the Last Crusade when Indiana Jones tries to impress the Nazis and their collaborator Walter Donovan that they will never find his friend Marcus Brody:

Indiana Jones: "The hell you will. He's got a two day head start on you, which is more than he needs. Brody's got friends in every town and village from here to the Sudan, he speaks a dozen languages, knows every local custom, he'll blend in, disappear, you'll never see him again. With any luck, he's got the grail already."
[Smash cut to an oriental bazaar.]
Marcus Brody: "Uhhh, does anyone here speak English? Or even ancient Greek?"

== See also ==
- Jump cut
- Match cut
