= Script supervisor =

Member of a film crew that oversees the continuity of scenes during filmmaking

A script supervisor (also called continuity supervisor or script) is a member of a film crew who oversees the continuity of the motion picture including dialogue and action during a scene. The script supervisor may also be called upon to ensure wardrobe, props, set dressing, hair, and makeup are consistent from scene to scene. The script supervisor keeps detailed notes on each take of the scene being filmed. The notes recorded by the script supervisor during the shooting of a scene are used to help the editor cut the scenes together in the order specified in the shooting script. They are also responsible for keeping track of the film production unit's daily progress.

The script supervisor credit is typically in the closing credits of a motion picture. The script supervisor is a department head and plays a crucial role in the shooting of a film. It is the script supervisor's job to monitor the camera shots, ensuring the dialogue and action match the corresponding pages of the shooting script. This oversight seeks to maintain coherence between the scenes.

The script supervisor is the editor's and writer's representative on set, as well as being the right-hand aide to the director and the director of photography. It is the script supervisor's job to make sure that the film can be cut together after shooting has concluded. In that sense, they back up every department, monitor the script during shooting, and make sure that errors in continuity do not occur that would prevent the film from being able to be compiled smoothly in the editing room.

In pre-production, the script supervisor creates a number of reports based on the script, including a one-line continuity synopsis providing basic information on each scene such as the time of day, day in story order, and a one-line synopsis of the scene. These reports are used by various departments in order to determine the most advantageous shot order and ensure that all departments, including production, wardrobe, set dressing, hair and makeup, are in sync in regard to the progression of time within the story. The script supervisor may also time the script, which is of enormous benefit for the director and the producer, and will often attend a table read or read-through with the cast.

== Responsibilities ==
During production, the script supervisor acts as a central point for all production information on a film shoot, and has several responsibilities:

- Continuity – The supervisor is responsible for working with all departments (camera, lighting, sound, wardrobe, make-up, properties and sets) to make sure that continuity errors do not happen. The script supervisor takes notes on all the details required to re-create the continuity of a particular scene, location, or action. For every take, the script supervisor will note the duration of the take (usually with a stopwatch) and meticulously log information into a daily editor log about the action of the take, including position of the main actor(s), screen direction of their movement, important actions performed during the shot, type of lens used, and additional information which may vary from case to case. When multiple cameras are in use, the script supervisor keeps separate notes on each. These logs also notate a director's comments on any particular take as to whether it is no good, a hold take (ok, but not perfect), or a print take (a good take). All of these notes are crucial not just for continuity – they provide the editor information on what the director prefers, any problems with any of the takes and other notes to assist the editing process.
- Axis and Eyelines – The script supervisor is also the go-to person for determining the axis of a scene. The supervisor keeps track of and helps the director and the camera-operator set the camera position and off-camera eyelines ensuring that the coverage of a scene cuts seamlessly and that the characters within a scene always appear, without any confusion on the part of the viewer, to be looking precisely at the intended character or object.
- Slating – The script supervisor interacts with the clapper loader (second camera assistant) and the production sound mixer to make sure that each take of exposed film has a consistently numbered slate, and that the sound and picture slates match. The script supervisor also notes the sound roll of each sync take, and the state of all MOS takes. This ensures that there is proper identification on the film footage in the editing room so the editor can find and use the correct takes.
- Script – The script supervisor is responsible for keeping the most current version of the shooting script. During shooting, the script supervisor notates any changes from the screenplay that are made by the actors, director or others during the actual filming process. If significant changes are made to the script that affect a future day's shooting, the script supervisor is responsible for providing those changes to the assistant director's team who then will distribute those changes to the rest of the crew. The script supervisor's script is also referred to as their lined script because during shooting, a script supervisor draws a vertical line down the page for each different camera setup. Each line designates the start and stop of that setup, a quick note of what the shot description was and whether or not the dialogue was on camera for that setup. This allows the editor to quickly reference which camera setups cover which portion of the dialogue or action.
- Circle Takes – Depending on the director's preferences, the script supervisor may mark certain takes in the notes that the director or director of photography indicates that they particularly liked.
- Production Reports – At the end of each shooting day, the script supervisor prepares daily reports for the production team. These reports vary in form depending on the studio or production company; however, they generally include a log of the actual times that shooting and breaks started and stopped, and a breakdown of the pages, scenes and minutes that were shot that day, as well as the same information for the previous day, the total script and the amounts remaining to be done. Also included are the number of scenes covered (completely shot), the number of retakes (when a scene has to be reshot), and the number of wild tracks. The script supervisor is the official timekeeper on any set.
- Editor's Notes – In addition to the production reports, each shooting day the script supervisor also compiles the continuity logs for the day's shooting as well as the relevant lined script pages for the scenes shot that day. Those notes are sent off to the editorial staff to assist them in the editing process.

The script supervisor is the primary liaison between the director (who decides what scenes are to be shot) and the editor (who is usually not present during actual filming but needs to have exact records of the filming in order to do the job of cutting the film together). The script supervisor is generally considered as part of the director's team. There is usually only one script supervisor on a given film production. However, on big studio productions, the Main Unit script supervisor will have an assistant and there is usually a Second Unit script supervisor.

== Earlier terms ==
Up until the late thirties and early forties, the script supervisor in the American film and television industry was typically called the continuity clerk, script reader or script girl and often there were two people doing the job. One was the "continuity clerk" and one was the "script girl". Individuals performing such duties were either credited with these titles or, more often, not credited at all. During this span of time, many script supervisors were indeed women, a fact that originally spawned the title "script girl." However, over the years, script supervisor positions throughout the American motion picture industry became more thoroughly integrated and formed a better balance among men and women. This fact, coupled with producers' desire to promote gender neutrality in a position that was increasingly taken up by men, produced the gradual change in nomenclature. The gender-specific term has disappeared from film and television credits, but sometimes appears in everyday speech.

== History ==
The Academy of Motion Picture Arts and Sciences credits Sarah Y. Mason as the first script supervisor, having invented the craft of film continuity for director Albert Parker and the film Arizona in 1918, for which she was credited as "Continuity Girl."

== See also ==
- Continuity (fiction)
- Shot (filming)
- Category:Script supervisors
- Angela Allen (script supervisor)
