= Point-of-view shot =

Type of photography or filmmaking shot

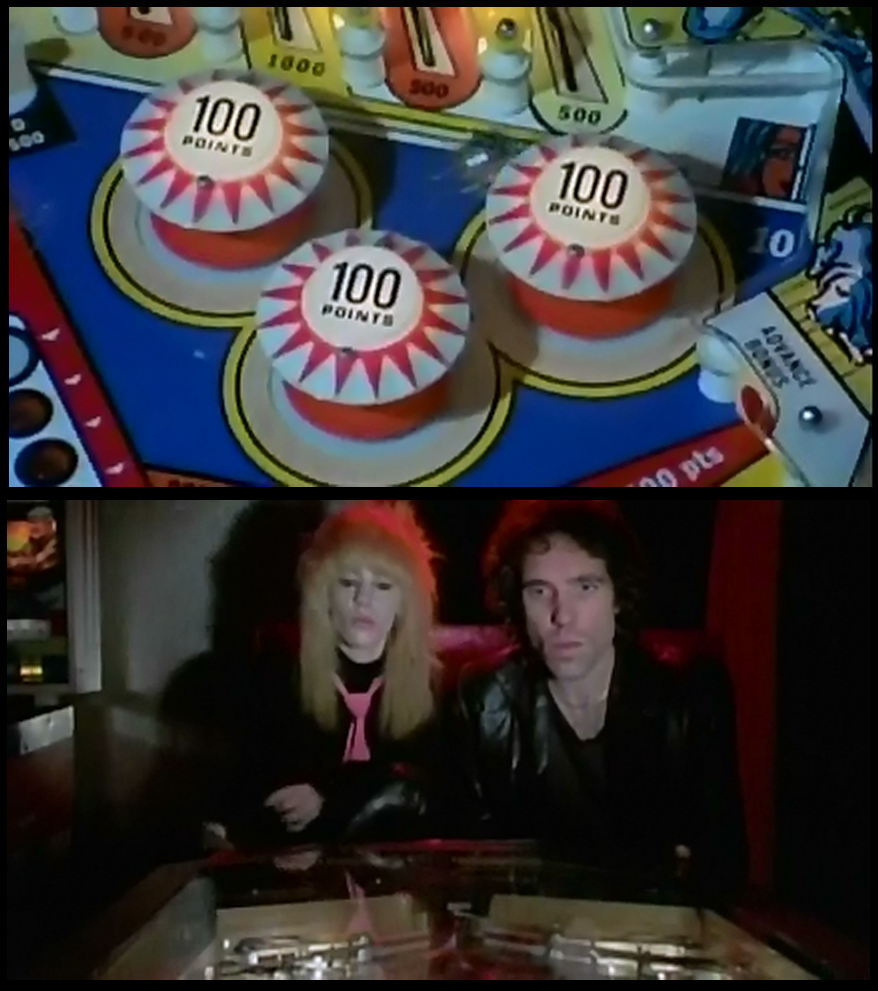
An example of an explicit POV shot from the public domain horror film The Driller Killer, putting the audience into the perspective of the protagonist playing pinball with the top shot coming five seconds before the below shot

A point-of-view shot, also known as a POV shot, first-person shot, or subjective camera, is a film technique where the camera is positioned to show what a certain character is seeing from their perspective. While traditional establishing shots, wide shots, medium shots, and close-ups offer an objective perspective of the scene, a POV shot offers a subjective point of view.

== Methods ==
A POV shot need not be the strict point-of-view of an actual single character in a film. Sometimes the point-of-view shot is taken over the shoulder of the character (third person), who remains visible on the screen. Sometimes a POV shot is "shared" ("dual" or "triple"), i.e. it represents the joint POV of two (or more) characters.

Point-of-view, or simply p.o.v., camera angles record the scene from a particular player's viewpoint. The point-of-view is an objective angle, but since it falls between the objective and subjective angle, it should be placed in a separate category and given special consideration. A point-of-view shot is as close as an objective shot can approach a subjective shot—and still remain objective. The camera is positioned at the side of a subjective player—whose viewpoint is being depicted—so that the audience is given the impression they are standing cheek-to-cheek with the off-screen player. The viewer does not see the event through the player's eyes, as in a subjective shot in which the camera trades places with the screen player. He sees the event from the player's viewpoint, as if standing alongside him. Thus, the camera angle remains objective, since it is an unseen observer not involved in the action."

—Joseph V. Mascelli, The Five C's of Cinematography

Supporting narrative elements are required to indicate the shot to the viewer as a POV shot. These may include shot sequencing (e.g. shot/reverse shot), sound effects, visual effects and acting. The next sequential shot often showcases the character's reaction to the event, which helps convey the feelings and emotional state.

Some films are partially or totally shot using this technique, for example the 1947 film noir Lady in the Lake, which is shot entirely through the subjective POV of its central character in an attempt to replicate the first-person narrative style of the Raymond Chandler novel upon which the film is based.

== Technology ==
POV footage has existed since the first cameras were mounted in early airplanes and cars, anywhere a film's creator intended to take viewers inside the action with the psychological purpose of giving viewers a feel of "What he or she is going through", he or she being a participant in the subject matter. Cameras were increasingly introduced into more difficult experiences.

Dick Barrymore, an early action filmmaker akin to Warren Miller, experimented with film cameras and counter weights mounted to a helmet. Barrymore could ski unencumbered while capturing footage of scenery and other skiers. Though the unit was heavy relative to its manner of use, it was considered hands-free, and worked.

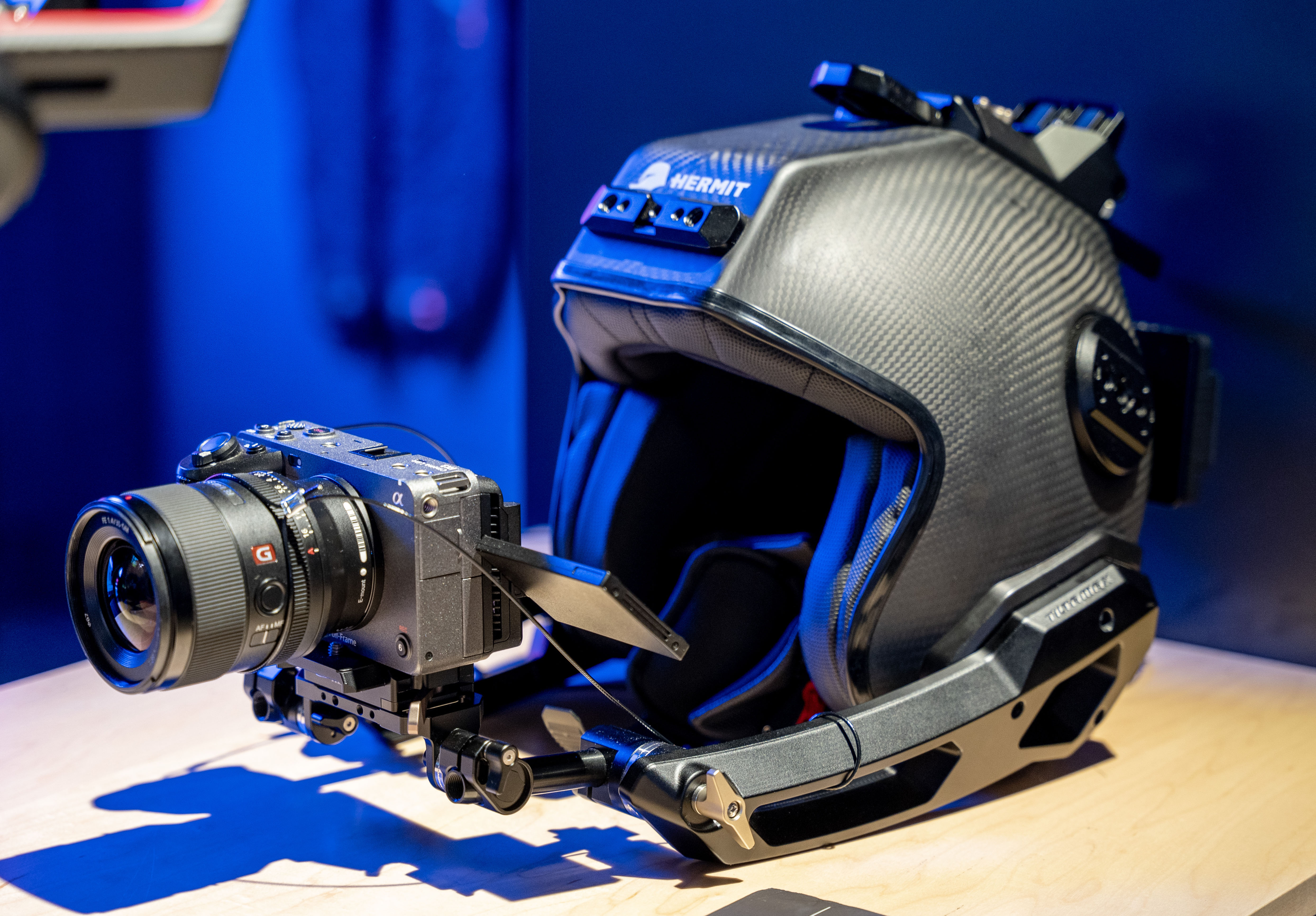
Tilta POV helmet for capturing point-of-view footage

Numerous companies have developed successful POV designs, from laparoscopic video equipment used inside the body during medical procedures, to high tech film and digital cameras mounted to jets and employed during flight, or on helmet based systems used by cinematographers. These designs are expensive, and mostly bespoke or DIY solutions. There are systems made by camera equipment manufacturers, but they require professional filmmaking experience and training.

Up until the 2010s, the race for hands-free POV cameras for use on a consumer level has faced problems. The technology has had issues with usability, combining lenses with microphones with batteries with recording units; all connected using spidery cables, which proved cumbersome in use when compared to the quality of the end content. Since then, improvements in mobile phone camera systems and the introduction of action cameras from companies like GoPro, DJI, and Insta360 have risen to the occasion and offer sophisticated camera stabilization with video quality that is impressive for their small camera sensor size.

== Notable examples ==
1927's Napoléon, directed by Abel Gance, is considered the first example of the POV technique in film. The camera was wrapped in sponge padding and mounted on a breastplate worn by main cameraman Jules Krugerg. Gance wrote in the technical scenario that the camera "defends itself as if it were Bonaparte himself... as if it were human. A punch in the lens. Arms at the side of the camera as if the camera itself had arms. [Krugerg] falls on the ground, struggles, gets up." Other early examples can be found in the silent horror film The Cat and the Canary (1927) and in the 1931 version of Dr. Jekyll and Mr. Hyde.

From the 1950s onwards POV shots have been commonly used both in films (e.g. Alfred Hitchcock's Rear Window) as well in TV series (e.g. The Plainclothesman).

Using the killer's point-of-view shots is very common in horror and thriller genres. Early instances of this can be found in Michael Powell's Peeping Tom (1960) and to a lesser extent in Alfred Hitchcock's Psycho (1960). The giallo director Mario Bava can be credited with fully formalising the technique in the early 1970s, and it was used to good effect also by Dario Argento. It was brought to North American horror films in slashers like Black Christmas (1974) and Halloween (1978).

POV shots have also been used in documentaries, such as I Didn't See You There (2022). It is shot from the physical perspective of director Reid Davenport, largely from his electric wheelchair. The film expands the scope of point-of-view cinema towards a disabled aesthetic generated by Davenport's embodiment.

== See also ==
- Camera angle – Element of cinematography
- Camera operator – Professional operator of a film or video camera
- Dutch angle – Type of camera shot
- Point-of-view pornography – Style of pornography
