= Shooting in the round =

Style in cinematography in which the actors are filmed from all sides

Shooting in the round refers to a style in cinematography in which the 180-degree rule is broken and the actors are filmed from all sides.

During TV show panel discussions, shooting in the round can help the guests feel like all the panelists are equal and create a feeling of greater intimacy.

The name of the style is originally brought from the theater, called theatre in the round.
