= Sequence (filmmaking) =

Series of scenes forming a unit in a film

In film, a sequence is a scene or a series of scenes that form a distinct narrative unit to advance the narrative, usually connected either by a unity of location or a unity of time. Each of these sequences might further contain sub-sequences. It is also known by the French term, "plan séquence". Sequence shots give the editor plenty of shots to tell a story and keep audiences' attention.

Sequencing refers to what one shoots, with the five most common shots used being: close-ups, wide angle, medium, over the shoulder, and point of view shots. Sequencing keeps viewer interest while maintaining a consistent story. The five most common shots are used to build a framework of where to place the characters or action.

The sequence is one of a hierarchy of structural units used to describe the structure of films in varying degrees of granularity. Analyzed this way, a film is composed of one or more acts; acts include one or more sequences; sequences are divided into one or more scenes; and scenes may be thought of as being built out of shots (if one is thinking visually) or beats (if one is thinking in narrative terms).

The sequence paradigm or the "8 sequence structure" of screenwriting was developed by Frank Daniel. In 2004, his protege Paul Gulino, published a book about this paradigm called, “Screenwriting: The Sequence Approach”.

== See also ==
- Act structure
- Sequential art
