= Tilta =

Video equipment manufacturer

- Company type: Private
- Industry: Film production
- Founded: 2010
- Founders: Wenping Zeng; Kefeng Zhou
- Headquarters: Burbank, California; Shenzhen, China
- Area served: Global
- Products: Camera equipment
- Number of employees: 290
- Website: tilta.com

Tilta is a manufacturer of cinema lens control systems, matte boxes, camera stabilization systems, camera cages, and other accessories. Its products are used in film, television, and videography by a wide range of professionals.

== History ==
Founders Wenping Zeng and Kefeng Zhou started working on filmmaking tools in 2008 and Tilta's first manufacturing facility opened in 2010. Its product line initially focused on accessory kits for DSLRs, then expanding to fully support cinema cameras. Through this process, Tilta has evolved to support systems, shock-absorbing car-mounts, etc.

== Products ==
=== Khronos Ecosystem ===
Tilta unveiled the Khronos Ecosystem for iPhone 15 Pro and Pro Max in April 2024. This lineup of accessories take advantage of the iPhone's increasingly powerful camera sensor for use as a full-fledged cinema, production, or ENG camera. The phone case features multiple integrated electronic contact points to send power to accessories without cables. The Khronos Focus PD Handle can be used to manually control focus and zoom when connected to a supported app like the Blackmagic Camera app. First shown at NAB Show Las Vegas 2024, it won a Product of the Year Award in Camera Support, Control and Accessories. It was also named one of Time's Best Inventions of 2024.

=== Wireless lens control systems ===
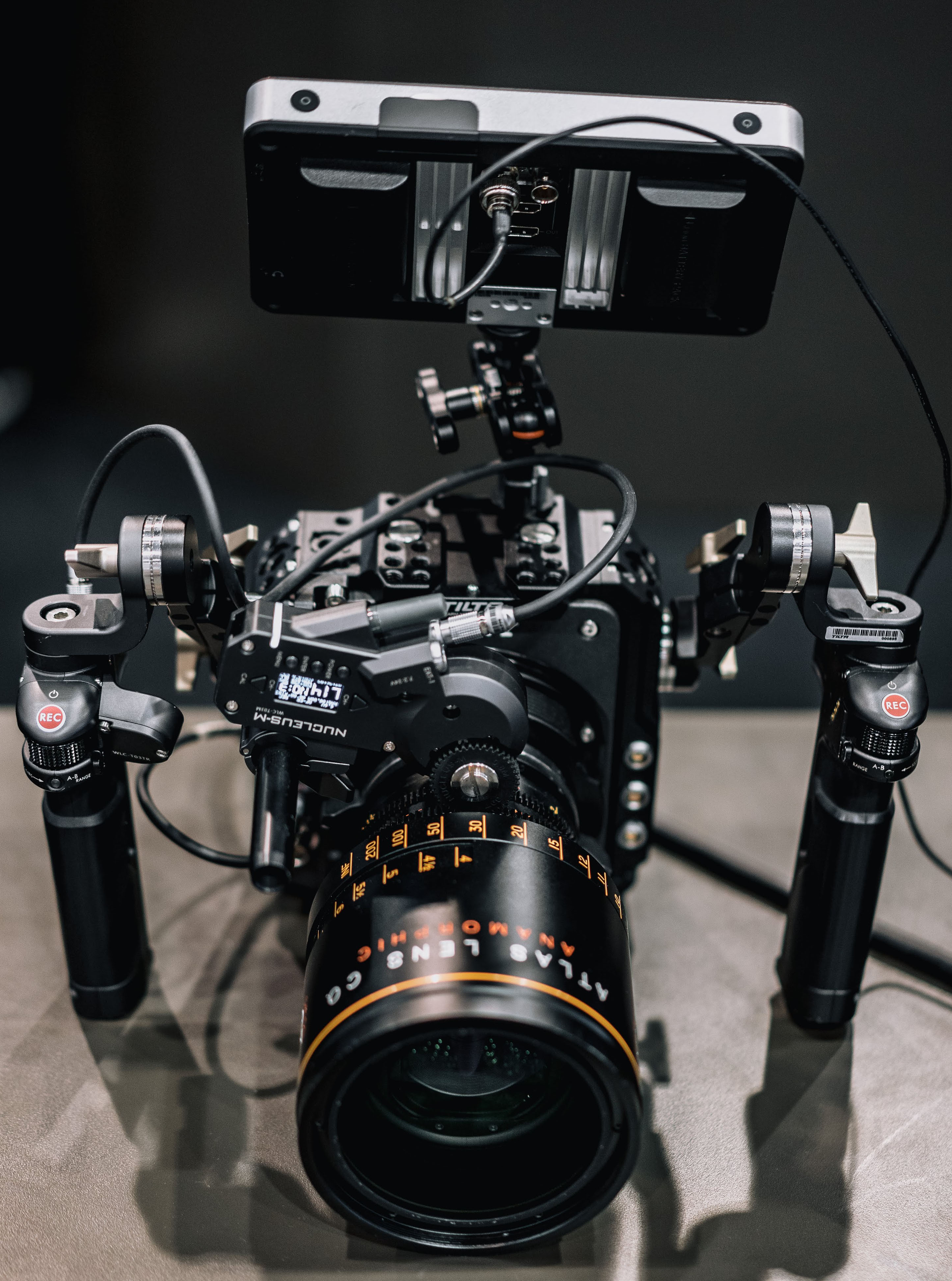
Camera rigged with Tilta Nucleus-M Wireless Lens Control System

In 2015, Tilta unveiled a wireless follow focus system with a single motor control at the BIRTV trade show. The WLC-T02 brought a technology mostly used on dramas and features to lower budget documentaries, short films, or other content. Three years later in 2018, Tilta released the WLC-T03 Nucleus-M Wireless Lens Control System as a follow up that included 3 motors and redesigned control devices. The controls let users wirelessly control focus, iris or zoom from up to 1000 ft. It worked well with leading cinema camera systems from RED or Arri, and a variety of lenses. The Nucleus-M has been Tilta's best selling product for 7 years. Building upon the Nucleus-M, Tilta released the Nucleus Nano in 2019. Seeing the trend towards smaller mirrorless cameras and increasing use of gimbals and drones, the Nucleus Nano miniaturized the wireless lens control system from Nucleus-M for these new use cases.

=== Camera stabilization ===
In 2013, Tilta introduced a camera shoulder rig made of aluminum and available for half the cost of competing systems at that time. Beginning in 2015, Tilta introduced the Armor Man gimbal support system with spring loaded arms that counteract the vertical motion that a camera operator creates when walking or running. In 2020, Tilta released an ecosystem of products for DJI's RS-series of gimbals. Integrating with the controls in the gimbals; for car mounted camera operation, handheld shooting, and other accessories introduced tools used in feature films to a wide range of content creators.

=== Matte boxes ===
Used to prevent light leakage from unwanted light sources and to add lens filters, Tilta manufactures matte box systems for cameras and lenses of all sizes. Introduced in 2021, the Tilta Mirage matte box is extremely lightweight and compact matte box, with an ecosystem of add-on accessories that allow for remote control of variable ND filters. The most unique feature is the ability to remotely control the intensity of the variable ND filter by rotating a little gear on the circular filter tray. Tilta offers a 9-stop variable ND option ranging from 0.3 to 2.7.

=== Camera cages ===
Tilta first designed a camera cage for the Canon 5D Mark II and has gone on to design and manufacture camera cages for video and cinema-focused camera systems from ARRI, Blackmagic Design, Fujifilm, RED, Sony, and others. Aside from protecting the camera, the cages have mounting points for adding additional lens support, external storage, external battery power, and more.

== Organization ==
=== Offices and manufacturing ===
Tilta's operations include multiple locations in and around Shenzhen, China. Since 2016, Tilta has operated a US-based showroom, warehouse, repair center and offices in Burbank, California.
