= Wide shot =

Cinematic techniques

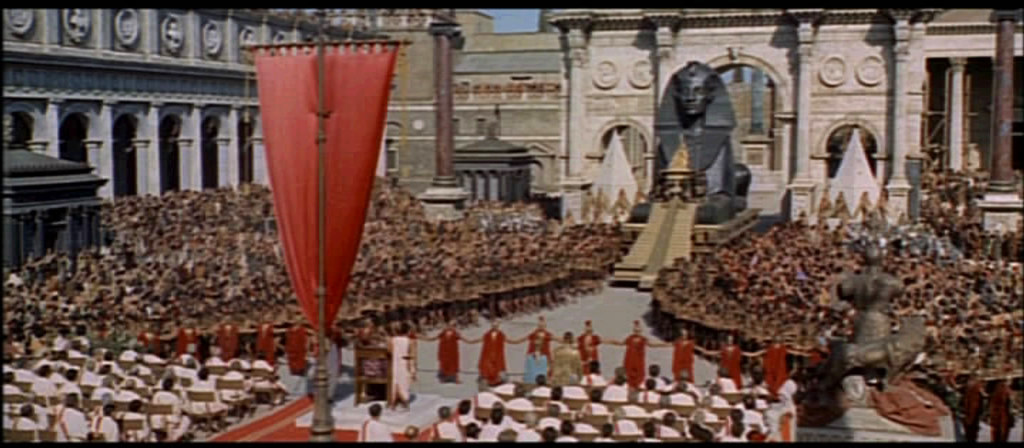
An extreme wide shot in the trailer to the 1963 film Cleopatra gives an expansive view of the set.

In photography, filmmaking and video production, a wide shot (sometimes referred to as a full shot or long shot) is a shot that typically shows the entire object or human figure and is usually intended to place it in some relation to its surroundings. These are typically shot using wide-angle lenses (an approximately 25 mm lens in 35 mm photography and 10 mm lens in 16 mm photography). However, due to sheer distance, establishing shots and extremely wide shots can use almost any lens type.

== History ==
Sallie Gardner at a Gallop

This type of filmmaking was a result of filmmakers trying to retain the sense of the viewer watching a play in front of them, as opposed to just a series of pictures.

The wide shot is a basic form of shooting within cinematography that has been used since the beginning of filmmaking. In 1878, one of the first motion pictures, Sallie Gardner at a Gallop, was released. Even though this wouldn't be considered a film in the current motion picture industry, it was a huge step towards complete motion pictures. It is arguable that it is very basic but it still remains that it was displayed as a wide angle as both the rider and horse are fully visible in the frame.

In the 1880s, celluloid photographic film and motion picture cameras became available so more motion pictures could be created in the form of Kinetoscope or through projectors. These early films also maintained a wide angle layout as it was the best way to keep everything visible for the viewer. Once motion pictures became more available in the 1890s, there were public screenings of many different films only being around a minute long, or even less. These films again adhered to the wide shot style. One of the first competitive filming techniques came in the form of the close-up, as George Albert Smith incorporated them into his film Hove. Though unconfirmed as the first usage of this method, it is one of the earliest recorded examples. Once the introduction of new framing techniques were introduced, more and more styles were developed and used for the benefits they could provide that wide shots couldn't.

In the early 1900s, motion pictures evolved from short, minute long, screenings to becoming full-length motion pictures. More and more cinematic techniques appeared, resulting in the wide shot being less commonly used. However, it still remained as it is almost irreplaceable in what it can achieve. When television entered the home in the 1960s, it was seen as a massive hit to the cinema industry and many saw it as the decline in cinema popularity. This in turn resulted in films having to stay ahead of television by incorporating superior quality than that of a television. This was done by adding color, but importantly it implemented the use of widescreen. This would allow a massive increase in space usable by the director, thus allowing an even wider shot for the viewer to witness more of any given shot.

Wide shots are frequently used in contemporary and modern filmmaking, as they have become a staple in cinema and are difficult to avoid without intention. Given the quality of modern home entertainment mediums such as Blu-ray, 3D and Ultra HD Blu Rays, this has allowed the scope and size of any given frame to encompass more of the scene and environment in greater detail.

== Types ==
There are a variety of ways of framing that are considered as being wide shots; these include:

Wide shot (WS)
The subject comfortably takes up the whole frame. In the case of a person, head to toe. This usually achieves a clear physical representation of a character and can describe the surroundings as it is usually visible within the frame. This results in the audience having a desired (by the director) view/opinion of the character or location.
Very wide shot (VWS)
The subject is only just visible in the location. This can find a balance between a "wide shot" and an "extreme wide shot" by keeping an emphasis on both the characters and the environment, almost finding a harmony between the two of them. This enables the ability to use the benefits of both types, by allowing the scale of the environment but also maintaining an element of focus on the character(s) or object(s) in frame.
Extreme wide shot (EWS)
The shot is so far away from the subject that they are no longer visible. This is used to create a sense of a character being lost or almost engulfed by the sheer size of their surroundings. This can result in a character being made small or insignificant due to their situation and/or surroundings.
Establishing shot (ES)
A shot typically used to display a location and is usually the first shot in a new scene. These establish the setting of a film, whether that is the physical location or the time period. Mainly it gives a sense of place to the film and brings the viewer to wherever the story requires them to be.
Master shot (MS)
This shot can be commonly mistaken for an establishing shot as it displays key characters and locations. However, it is actually a shot in which all relevant characters are in frame (usually for the whole duration of the scene), with inter-cut shots of other characters to shift focus. This is a very useful method for retaining audience focus as most shots in this style refrain from using cuts and therefore will keep the performances and the dialogue in the forefront of what is going on for the duration of the scene.

== Notable examples ==
Many directors are known for their use of the variety of wide shots. A key example of them is the frequent use of establishing shots and very wide shots in Peter Jackson's The Lord of the Rings trilogy, showing the vast New Zealand landscape to instil awe in the audience.

In the 1993 film Schindler's List, there is a running image of a small girl trapped within a concentration camp wearing a red coat (the only colour in the film). She is frequently pictured in a wide shot format as a way to display both her and the horrific surroundings to build a disturbing contrast.

In the 1939 film The Wizard of Oz, a very wide shot is used that keeps all the protagonists on screen with the Wizard's palace in clear view. The Wizard of Oz was also one of the first mainstream motion pictures to include colour.

The 1962 Lawrence of Arabia contains an enormous number of extreme wide shots which successfully induced the feeling of scale of the lead in his surrounding and aesthetically dwarfed him due to his surroundings making him seem more vulnerable and weak.

The 1981 film Raiders of the Lost Ark contains the use of a wide shot to show the dangerous scale of a boulder that is chasing the protagonist.

The 2008 film The Dark Knight featured a practical stunt in which a large truck and trailer are flipped nose first. This is shot very far back to give the shot more clarity and to see the flip through its entirety as opposed to cutting midway through.

In the 2015 Ridley Scott film The Martian, the protagonist Mark Watney is stranded on Mars and the film contains many wide shots. These are used to show the Martian landscape and give the character the sense of isolation that the film would want.

== See also ==
- Camera operator
- Cinematographer
- Film director
- Long take
- Video production
- Videography
