= Axial cut =

Cinematic editing technique

In filmmaking, an axial cut is a type of jump cut, where the camera suddenly moves closer to or further away from its subject, along an invisible line drawn straight between the camera and the subject. While a plain jump cut typically involves a temporal discontinuity (an apparent jump in time), an axial cut is a way of maintaining the illusion of continuity. Axial cuts are used rarely in contemporary cinema, but were fairly common in the cinema of the 1910s and 1920s.

An axial cut can be made with the use of a zoom lens, or physically moving the camera with a crane or camera dolly. The intervening footage (as the camera moves or zooms) is then removed while editing the film. Since footage is discarded, this technique works better for static shots. If action is involved, several takes will be required to get the necessary footage.

Alternatively, a multiple-camera setup can be used, with the cameras showing the subject at different sizes. The footage from both cameras is then edited together to create the effect. As the cameras cannot occupy the same space, there will always be a slight deviation from the axis. Moving the cameras further away from the subject and using telephoto lenses can reduce the deviation.

== Directors who use axial cuts ==
- Dario Argento
- Frank Capra
- Sergei Eisenstein
- Alfred Hitchcock
- Lev Kuleshov
- Akira Kurosawa
- John McTiernan
- Martin Scorsese
- Hiroshi Shimizu
- Steven Spielberg
- Sadao Yamanaka
- James Whale
- Brian De Palma
- Peter Bogdanovich
