= 180-degree rule =

Principle in filmmaking

This schematic shows the axis between two characters and the 180° arc on which cameras may be positioned (green). When cutting from the green arc to the red arc, the characters switch places on the screen.

In filmmaking, the 180-degree rule is a guideline regarding the on-screen spatial relationship between a character and another character or object within a scene. The rule states that the camera should be kept on one side of an imaginary axis between two characters, so that the first character is always frame right of the second character. Moving the camera over the axis is called jumping the line or crossing the line; breaking the 180-degree rule by shooting on all sides is known as shooting in the round.

The 180-degree rule enables the viewer to visually connect with unseen movement happening around and behind the immediate subject and is particularly important in the narration of battle scenes.

== Examples ==
In a dialogue scene between two characters, a straight line can be imagined running through the two characters. If the camera remains on one side of this line, the spatial relationship between the two characters will be consistent from shot to shot. Shifting to the other side of the characters on a cut will reverse the order of the characters from left to right and may disorient the viewer.

The rule also applies to the movement of a character as the "line" created by the path of the character. For example, if a character is walking in a leftward direction and is to be picked up by another camera, the character must exit the first shot on frame left and enter the next shot frame right.

A jump cut can be utilized to denote time. If a character leaves the frame on the left side and enters the frame on the left in a different location, it can give the illusion of an extended amount of time passing.

Another example could be a car chase: If a vehicle leaves the right side of the frame in one shot, it should enter from the left side of the frame in the next shot. Leaving from the right and entering from the right creates a similar sense of disorientation as in the dialogue example.

== Reverse cuts ==
The imaginary line allows viewers to orient themselves with the position and direction of action in a scene. If a shot following an earlier shot in a sequence is located on the opposite side of the 180-degree line, then it is called a "reverse cut". Reverse cuts disorient the viewer by presenting an opposing viewpoint of the action in a scene and consequently altering the perspective of the action and the spatial orientation established in the original shot.

There are a variety of ways to avoid confusion related to crossing the line due to particular situations caused by actions or situations in a scene that would necessitate breaking the 180-degree line. The movement in the scene can be altered, or cameras set up on one side of the scene so that all the shots reflect the view from that side of the 180-degree line.

Another way to allow for crossing the line is to have several shots with the camera arching from one side of the line to the other during the scene. That shot can be used to orient the viewer to the fact that they are looking at the scene from another angle. In the case of movement, if a character is seen walking into frame from behind on the left side walking towards a building corner on the right, as they walk around the corner of the building, the camera can catch them coming towards the camera on the other side of the building entering the frame from the left side and then walk straight at the camera and then exit the left side of the frame.

To minimize the "jolt" between shots in a sequence on either sides of the 180-degree line, a buffer shot can be included along the 180-degree line separating each side. This lets the viewer visually comprehend the change in viewpoint expressed in the sequence.

== Style ==
In The Shining, Stanley Kubrick shoots wide shots from both directions, a 180-degree flip, crossing the line.

In professional productions, the applied 180-degree rule is an essential element for a style of film editing called continuity editing. The rule is not always obeyed. Sometimes a filmmaker purposely breaks the line of action to create disorientation. Carl Theodor Dreyer did this in The Passion of Joan of Arc; Stanley Kubrick also did this in the bathroom scene in The Shining. Directors Jacques Demy, Tinto Brass, Yasujirō Ozu, Wong Kar-wai, and Jacques Tati have also ignored this rule sometimes, as has Lars von Trier in Antichrist. In the seminal French New Wave film À bout de souffle (Breathless), Jean-Luc Godard breaks the rule in the first five minutes in a car scene which jumps between the front and back seats, improvising an "aesthetic rebellion" for which the New Wave would become known.

When the rule is broken accidentally, or for a technical reason (such as the inability to place a camera physically in the correct position), there are techniques which may be employed to attempt to hide it. For example, the editor may pre-lap a word or two of dialog prior to the cut, so that the viewer will concentrate on what is being said as a distraction from the breaking of cinematic convention.

Some styles used with the 180-degree rule can elicit an emotion or create a visual rhythm. By moving the camera closer to the axis for a close-up shot, it can amp up the intensity of a scene when paired with a long shot. When the camera is moved further away from the axis for a long shot after a close-up shot, it may provide a break in the action of the scene.

In the Japanese anime feature Paprika, two of the main characters discuss, and demonstrate, the disorientating effect of crossing the line.

== Empirical research ==
Empirical evidence exploring the importance of maintaining the 180-degree rule is limited. The basic premise is that abiding by the rule helps keep characters on the correct side of the screen. Thus, it is assumed that if the rule is violated, it can lead to distraction and disrupt the flow of the moment. This is then extrapolated to affect the rhythm, or emotions of the scene. However, these notions are rooted in filmmakers' subjective reports, rather than empirical evidence.

Some research has demonstrated that crossing the line can negatively affect the accuracy of spatial representation of the scene. Furthermore, flipping the characters' positions can disrupt the viewer's understanding of the relative orientations on screen. Violations appear to also affect spatial memory for the location of objects in a scene, but they do not affect memory for the narrative, the order of unfolding events, nor the understanding of narrative flow.

Broadly speaking, empirical research indicates that abiding by the 180-degree rule is not necessary in a practical sense. Accurate spatial representations may not be important for the scene, nor are they remembered across the longer duration of a movie. Furthermore, more recent research has demonstrated that while viewers can spot violations, the presence of these violations has a negligible effect on the enjoyment of the scene or movie.

== See also ==
- Continuity editing
- 30-degree rule
