= Shot (filmmaking) =

Series of frames that runs for an uninterrupted period of time

In filmmaking and video production, a shot is a series of frames that runs for an uninterrupted period of time. Film shots are an essential aspect of a movie where angles, transitions and cuts are used to further express emotion, ideas and movement. The term "shot" can refer to two different parts of the filmmaking process:

1. In production, a shot is the moment that the camera starts rolling until the moment it stops.
2. In film editing, a shot is the continuous footage or sequence between two edits or cuts.

== Etymology ==
The term "shot" is derived from the early days of film production when cameras were hand-cranked, and operated similarly to the hand-cranked machine guns of the time. That is, a cameraman would "shoot" film the way someone would "shoot" bullets from a machine gun.

== Categories of shots ==
Shots can be categorized in a number of ways.

=== By field size ===
The field size explains how much of the subject and its surrounding area is visible within the camera's field of view, and is determined by two factors: the distance of the subject from the camera ("camera-subject distance") and the focal length of the lens. Note that the shorter a lens's focal length, the wider its angle of view (the 'angle' in wide-angle lens, for instance, which is "how much you see"), so the same idea can also be expressed as that the lens's angle of view plus camera-subject distance is the camera's field of view.

- the long shot or wide shot (often used as an establishing shot), that shows the environment around the subjects,
- the full shot, where the entirety of the subject is just visible within the frame,
- the medium-long shot, where the frame ends near the knees,
- the medium shot, where the frame stops either just above or just below the waist,
- the medium close-up, where more of the shoulder is visible than in the close-up,
- the close-up, where the shoulder line is visible,
- the extreme close-up, where the frame stops at the subject's chin and forehead.

Three less often used field sizes are:

- the extreme long shot (used for epic views and panoramas),
- the American shot (also 3/4 shot), a slight variation of the medium-long shot to also include outside the waistband handgun holsters in Western movies, a characterization from French film criticism for a type of shot in certain American films of the 1930s and 1940s also referred to as a "Cowboy shot" in reference to the gun holster being just above the bottom frame line,
- the "Italian shot", where only a person's eyes are visible, named after the genre of Italo-Westerns, particularly the Dollars Trilogy by Sergio Leone, that established this particular field size.
Field size shots comparison (* = "basic" shots)
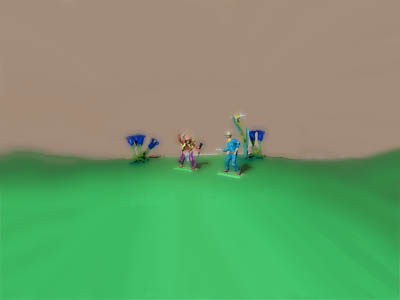
Extreme long shot

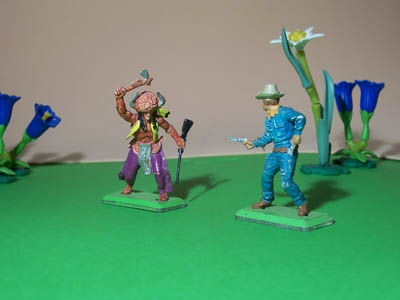
*Long shot

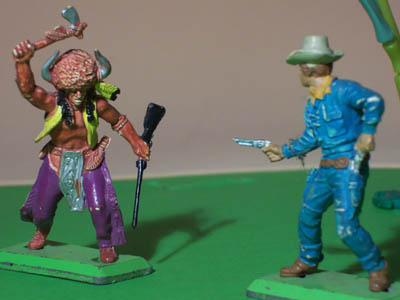
*Full shot (figure shot, complete view, medium long shot)

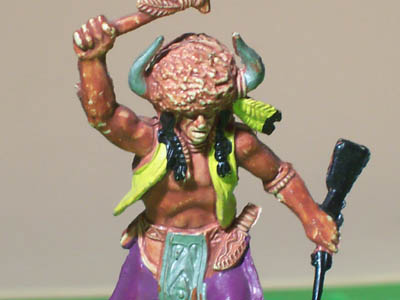
Medium long shot (American shot, 3/4 shot)

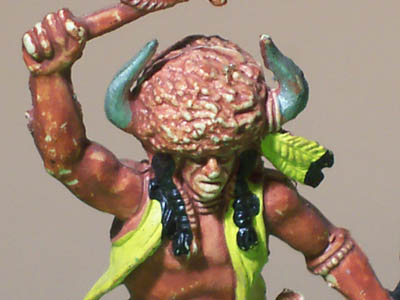
*Medium shot

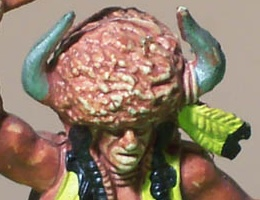
Medium close-up shot

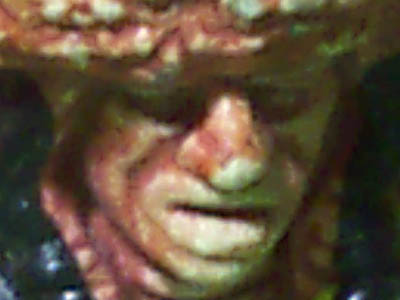
*Close-up shot

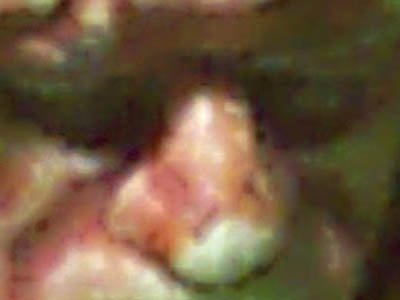
Extreme close-up (Detail shot, Italian shot)

=== By camera placement ===
"Shots" referring to camera placement and angle rather than field size include:

- Camera angles:
  - the aerial shot,
  - the bird's-eye shot (sometimes performed as a crane shot),
  - the low-angle shot,
- the over the shoulder shot,
- the point of view shot,
- the reverse shot is defined as a 180-degree camera turn to the preceding image, common in point of view and over the shoulder (in the latter, care must be applied to avoid a continuity error by violating the 180 degree rule),
- the two shot where two people are in the picture.

=== By other criteria ===
- the establishing shot is defined by giving an establishing "broad overview" over a scene, whether performed by a wide shot with a fixed camera, a zoom, a series of different close-ups achieved by camera motion, or a sequence of independent close-angle shots edited right after each other,
- the master shot is a scene done in one single take, with no editing
- the freeze frame shot is created in editing by displaying a single frame for an elongated duration of time
- the insert shot is created in editing by replacing a picture with another while the audio stays the same
- the dolly shot, also known as a tracking or travelling shot, in which the camera moves toward or away from its subject while filming. Traditionally dolly shots are filmed from a camera dolly but the same motion may also be performed with a Steadicam or gimbal. A dolly shot is generally described in terms of "dollying in" or "dollying out".
- the Martini shot, the last shot of the day.

== Film editing ==
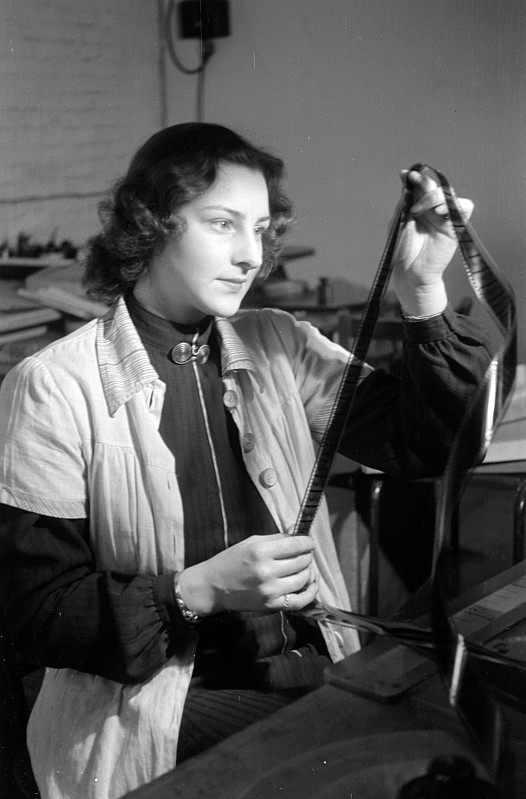
A film editor at work in 1946

Cutting between shots taken at different times or from different perspectives is known as film editing, and is one of the central arts of filmmaking.

== Duration ==
The length of shots is an important consideration that can greatly affect a film. The purpose of editing any given scene is to create a representation of the way the scene might be perceived by the "story teller." Shots with a longer duration can make a scene seem more relaxed and slower-paced whereas shots with a shorter duration can make a scene seem urgent and faster-paced.

The average shot length (ASL) of a film is one of its cinemetrical measures. For example, The Mist has a length of 117 minutes and consists of 1292 shots, so the ASL is 5.4 seconds, while Russian Ark is a single 96-minute long take, so an ASL of 96 minutes or about 5,760 seconds, a factor of 1,000 difference.

Shots with extremely long durations are difficult to do because any error in the shot would force the filmmaker to restart from scratch, and are thus only occasionally used. Films famous for their long cuts include Francis Ford Coppola's The Godfather in which the entire first scene is a long take featuring Bonasera describing the assault on his daughter, and Alfred Hitchcock's Rope, which only cuts at the end of each reel, and does so surreptitiously so that it seems as if the whole film is one take. Orson Welles's Touch of Evil opens with a long tracking crane shot, as does Robert Altman's The Player.

In addition to Russian Ark, which was made in 2002 using digital recording technology, other films known for their extremely long takes include Stanley Kubrick's 2001: A Space Odyssey and the works of Andrei Tarkovsky starting with Solaris. Béla Tarr is also known for using very long takes consistently in his films. Joss Whedon's feature film Serenity introduces the main characters with a long take. Although Fish & Cat is a single 134-minute long take, the narrator succeeded in playing with time and including several flashbacks.

== See also ==
- Camera angle
- Film frame
- Filmmaking
- Take
- List of one-shot music videos
