= Jump cut =

Film editing technique

A spatial jump cut at 0:05 seconds from It's a Wonderful Life (1946) in which James Stewart's character answers a telephone.

A jump cut is a cut in film editing that breaks a single continuous sequential shot of a subject into two parts, with a piece of footage removed to create the effect of jumping forward in time. Camera positioning on the subject across the sequence should vary only slightly to achieve the effect. The technique manipulates temporal space using the duration of a single shot—fracturing the duration to move the audience ahead. Jean-Luc Godard's Breathless extensively used jump cuts and popularized the technique in the 1960s.

This kind of cut abruptly communicates the passing of time, as opposed to the more seamless dissolve. For this reason, jump cuts are considered a violation of classical continuity editing, which aims to give the appearance of continuous time and space in the story-world by de-emphasizing editing, but are sometimes nonetheless used for creative purposes. Jump cuts tend to draw attention to the constructed nature of the film. More than one jump cut is sometimes used in a single sequence.

Continuity editing uses a guideline called the "30-degree rule" to avoid the appearance of jump cuts. The 30-degree rule advises that for consecutive shots to appear seamless and continuous in time, the camera position must vary at least 30 degrees from its previous position. Some schools would call for a change in framing as well (e.g., from a medium shot to a close up). The idea is to convey to the viewer a different point of view on the action but with the timeline of the action being continuous. Generally, if the camera position changes less than 30 degrees, the difference between the two shots is not substantial enough, and the viewer experiences the edit as a jump in the position of the subject rather than a change of point of view, which is jarring.

Jump cuts, on the other hand, keep the camera's relationship to the subject the same but jump forward in time in the action. Jump cuts can be created by editing together two shots filmed non-continuously (a spatial jump cut)—but can also be made by removing a middle section of one continuously filmed shot (a temporal jump cut). Jump cuts can add a sense of speed to the sequence of events.

== History ==
In Percy Stow's 1908 short film The Tempest, jump cuts are used for some of the visual effects.

The effect was used in the early film The Tempest (1908) when Ariel magically disappears and reappears. Dziga Vertof's avant-garde Russian film Man With a Movie Camera (1929) is almost entirely composed of jump cuts. Contemporary use of the jump cut largely stems from its appearance in the work of Jean-Luc Godard (at the suggestion of Jean-Pierre Melville) and other filmmakers of the French New Wave of the late 1950s and 1960s. In Godard's ground-breaking Breathless (1960), for example, he with editor Cécile Decugis cut together shots of Jean Seberg riding in a convertible in such a way that emphasized the discontinuity between shots to create a deliberate jarring effect. In the clip above the scene abruptly changes perspective, emphasizing a gap in action. Jump cuts have appeared in films like Snatch by Guy Ritchie, and Run Lola Run by Tom Tykwer. It is frequently used in TV editing, in documentaries produced by Discovery Channel and National Geographic Channel, for example. It is noticeable in Universal Monsters films and music videos.

== Notable examples ==
The jump cut sometimes serves a political use in film. Some have used it as an alienating, Brechtian technique (the Verfremdungseffekt) that makes the audience aware of the unreality of the film experience in order to focus attention on a political message rather than the drama or emotion of the narrative. This may be observed in some segments of Sergei Eisenstein's The Battleship Potemkin.

Alexander Dovzhenko used jump cuts in Arsenal (Soviet Union, 1929), in which a close-up shot of a character's face cuts closer and closer a total of nine times. Mark Cousins comments that this "fragmentation captured his indecision ... and confusion", adding that "Although the effect jars, the idea of visual conflict was central to Soviet montage cinema of that time".

Jump cuts are sometimes used to show a nervous searching scene, as is done in the 2009 science fiction film Moon in which the protagonist, Sam Bell, is looking for a secret room on a Moon base, and District 9 in which the protagonist, Wikus, searches for illegal objects in the house of Christopher's friend.

Jump cuts plays a significant and disorienting role in a scene of Joel and Ethan Coen's A Serious Man. They intersperse shots of Rabbi Nachtner and Larry Gopnik having a conversation in the Rabbi's office with shots of an earlier meeting that Nachtner had with a different person in the same office.

In television, Rowan & Martin's Laugh-In editor Arthur Schneider won an Emmy Award in 1968 for his pioneering use of the jump cut. Jump cutting remained an uncommon TV technique until shows like Homicide: Life on the Street popularized it on the small screen in the 1990s.

The music video for "Everybody Have Fun Tonight" makes extensive use of the jump cut.

Other uses of the jump cuts include Vincent Gallo's short Flying Christ in which various shots of "Christ" jumping are cut together as he is in mid-jump, creating the illusion of flight, and in many vlogs online, as popularized by the show with zefrank.

British comedian Russell Kane has produced a series of comic, satirical videos, named "Kaneings", in response to current events. These make extensive use of jump-cut-style editing.

== See also ==
- Match cut
- Smash cut
