= James Thomas Engineering =

- James Thomas Engineering Logo
- Industry: Entertainment rigging and Stage lighting
- Founded: Bishampton, England (February 1977)
- Founder: James Thomas, John Walters
- Headquarters: Worcester, United Kingdom
- Number of locations: 2
- Area served: Worldwide
- Products: PixelRange Fixtures; General Purpose Truss
- Website: www.jamesthomas.co.uk

James Thomas Engineering (JTE) is a British manufacturing company based in Worcester, Worcestershire. From 1990, the company also has offices in Knoxville, Tennessee. The company manufactures stage lighting equipment and stage rigging equipment, such as trusses, PAR lamp enclosures and more recently LED stage lighting equipment.

== History ==
James Thomas Engineering was formed in February 1977 in a small garage in Bishampton, England by James Thomas and John Walters, manufacturing spun aluminium par lanterns. In 1978 it moved to Pershore and started manufacturing truss. It developed a pre-rigged truss system in 1983 and relocated to larger premises in Pershore in 1984. In 1990 JTE opened a USA office for manufacturing truss.

In July 2000 the UK office relocated again to a larger 52,700 square foot facility in Worcester and in October 2001 the USA site relocated to a 30,000 square foot facility.

In 2002 the company started manufacturing LED stage lighting fixtures as part of a product range known as PixelRange, including the 1044 PixelLine fixture.

== Indiana State Fair ==
James Thomas Engineering was implicated in a number of lawsuits arising as a result of the Indiana State Fair stage collapse in 2011.
