= Dimensioning on drawings =

Indication of dimensions on a drawing

Dimensioning in technical drawing.

Dimensioning is the annotation methodology of measurements of an object or objects in a technical drawing. Dimensioning involves information such as relative distances, lengths, references, and materials through the use of lines, symbols, figures, and notes. Dimensioning is the diagrammatic placement of annotations in order to provide information necessary for legibility of planning documents. Dimensions typically convey both the measurements and proportions of the plan elements as well as their relative position to another object or to a real-life benchmark.

== Standards ==
Dimensioning is regulated in Europe by standard DIN 999-8, and internationally by standard ISO 129-1:2018 (International Organisation for Standardisation, No. 129, section 1), which came into force in 2018. There are more specific standards such as ISO 2768-1, which defines the rules for general tolerances for lengths and angles, and ISO 2768-2 on general standards for form and position of the views.

== Components ==
Dimensioning components: (1) start mark (2) dimension line (3) dimension number (4) auxiliary reference line (5) end mark.

Dimensioning of repetitive elements.

Types of annotations according to their purpose: A) dimensional annotations, B) location annotations

Dimensions are composed of the following elements:

- "Dimension number:" is the number that indicates the measured magnitude.
- "Dimension line:" this is the line parallel to the edge of the object being measured. Its ends are indicated by two marks or symbols.
- "Auxiliary or projection lines:" these lines are perpendicular to what they are measuring, and they delimit the dimension lines.
- "Extension or reference line:" this is an auxiliary line that runs from the ends of an edge or surface to the ends of a dimension line. These lines are used to indicate the details of the drawn part and have a wide range of possibilities; they can end in an arrow if they end at the contour, in a circle if they end inside the part, or in a line if they end at other dimension lines.
- "Note lines:" these indicate additional values or notes.
- "Symbols:" these are additional graphic indications.
- "Endpoints:" endpoints refer to the ends of dimension lines. There are a wide variety of these, but the most commonly used is an isosceles triangle with an unequal angle of 15°.

Some symbols, such as the diameter symbol used to dimension arcs or circles with an angle greater than 180°, and the R (radius) symbol used for arcs less than 180°. The most commonly used symbols in dimensioning are:

Symbol	Definition
□	Square (shape)
⌀	Diameter
R	Radius
SR	Spherical radius
S⌀	Spherical diameter

When it is necessary to dimension a group of regularly spaced elements, a single dimension line is drawn, on which the number of times the value is repeated, the multiplicative sign X, the repeated dimension, the sign = and the sum of all the dimensions are written.

== Types of dimensioning ==
=== Dimensioning by coordinates ===
Dimensioning by coordinates: A) dimensioning by polar coordinates; B) dimensioning on base lines

If it is possible to dimension using two series of dimensions with common origins, it is preferable to use coordinate dimensioning, where the abscissas and ordinates of the elements are given in a table attached to the drawing.

=== Tabulated dimensioning ===
When one needs to give the dimensions of series or groups of parts or products where the dimensions could be confusing, it is advisable to use letters instead of values. The value of the letters for the different products or parts is indicated next to the drawing.

=== Parallel dimensioning ===
In this type of dimensioning, all dimensions start from the same origin, the longest face or edge, parallel to the drawing, so it can be said that all dimensions in the same direction have a common reference element and refer to that element.

=== Combined dimensioning ===
This consists of a combination of the above.

== Dimensions and their types ==
Dimensions are about numbers and lines. When dimensions do not fit between auxiliary lines, they are placed on the extension of the dimension lines, or reference lines may also be used in these cases. In small circles and/or arcs of a circle, the dimension should be placed on the outside, on the right-hand side, or in the case of arcs, it should be placed where the arrow is.

For a symmetrical part, there are specific rules. In such a figure, the alternative dimensions will be arranged so that only part of the dimension line is drawn. These end in an arrow next to the auxiliary line, and the other end should protrude slightly from the axis of symmetry or the axis of rotation. The dimension should be placed on the right.

If it is necessary or required to modify a dimension in a previous drawing, the dimension must be crossed out so that it is still visible, and the new dimension must be placed next to the crossed-out dimension. The new dimension always takes precedence over the scale of the drawing. If a drawing is presented at a different scale for a particular dimension, that dimension is indicated by underlining it. In the case of interrupted views, the dimension should not be underlined, because the drawing is not on a different scale; it is a simplification of the drawing.

There are different types of dimensions in a figure, which are divided into five main categories:

- "Functional:" This type of dimension is one of the most fundamental in a part. For example, this dimension would measure the distance between two holes located in the figure, so that another part can be created that fits perfectly with it.
- "Non-functional:" These are not fundamental to the part.
- "Auxiliary:" These dimensions help to verify some of the measurements, although they are not necessary to include. Auxiliary dimensions must be placed in parentheses.
- "Verification:" These are the dimensions required by the customer, which are used to check some of the measurements and dimensions that were previously required before the design was created. These are enclosed in a rounded box.
- "Rough:" This type of dimension consists of a series of measurements taken from the parts prior to machining, found on all or part of the part.

== Fundamental principles of dimensioned drawing ==
- 1. Dimension lines must not cross anything.
- 2. Reference or extension lines must meet the dimension line at a 90-degree angle, except in special cases.
- 3. Dimensions must be placed in an orderly and aligned manner, with one dimension line above the other.
- 4. Detail dimensions should be closest to the drawing, followed by general dimensions.
- 5. The indicator line should not touch the visible profile line of the drawing.
- 6. Hidden lines should not be dimensioned.
- 7. The spacing of dimension lines should be uniform throughout the drawing.
- 8. Numbers and notes should be written on guide lines.
- 9. The length of the arrowhead should be approximately the height of the whole numbers.
- 10. The indicator line directed to a circle must be radial.
- 11. Indicator lines must not cross each other, as this would interfere with other lines.
- 12. Dimension lines must not cross extension lines.
- 13. Dimension lines must not coincide with drawing lines.
- 14. Decimal figures must clearly show their decimal point or comma.
- 15. Numbers should be placed, as far as possible, outside areas with section hatching.
- 16. When all dimensions are given in the same metric system, a note specifying the system should be included.
- 17. Dimension lines should be drawn, leaving a sufficiently large distance to label the dimension, approximately 8 mm.
- 18. Roundings and chamfers should be dimensioned by extending the dimension lines and edge lines.
- 19. Axes and edges should never be used as dimension lines.
- 20. Chords, angles and arcs can be dimensioned correctly in two different ways; the dimension lines are parallel or concentric to the element. The symbols of an arc and an open triangle can be used to differentiate between an angle and an arc.y line, and the other end should protrude slightly from the axis of symmetry or the axis of rotation. The dimension should be placed on the right.

== Arrangement of dimensions ==
In drawings, all the dimensions necessary to make the part must always be included, meaning that it must be possible to draw or manufacture it. As for the dimensional dimensions, these must be included in the view that best defines the part to be dimensioned. (Remember that the representation of parts in technical drawings includes the elevation, the plan and the right and left profiles). Dimensions should not be duplicated across different views. For example, if the height of a figure is dimensioned in the profile view, it should not be repeated in the elevation view, as this may lead to confusion.

A single auxiliary line cannot be used for two different views. Nor should shapes that are the result of a manufacturing process be dimensioned. Another process that should not be used is dimensioning using hidden lines. If it is not possible to make that dimension in another view, the part should be broken so that those views can be seen and dimensioned.

== Simplifications ==
When equal dimensions are found, it can be said that the part has parts, so the dimension figures can be replaced by the equal sign (=).

If one is presented with elements that are equidistant from each other, the dimensioning can be simplified so that it would only be dimensioned once individually and once generally. If the separation is clearly represented, it will not be necessary to indicate the separation of the elements. If the elements one finds are the same in terms of dimensions, but the separations are not, this must also be indicated.

== See also ==
- Architectural drawing
- ASME AED-1 Aerospace and Advanced Engineering Drawings
- Descriptive geometry
- Engineering drawing abbreviations and symbols
- Geometric dimensioning and tolerancing
- Linear scale
- Metric scale, architect's scale and engineer's scale
- Patent drawing
- Structural drawing
