= ISO 7200 =

Standard for document headers etc. in technical drawings

ISO 7200, titled Technical product documentation - Data fields in title blocks and document headers, is an international technical standard defined by ISO which describes title block formats to be used in technical drawings.

== Revisions ==
- ISO 7200:1984
- ISO 7200:2004

== Other ISO standard related to technical drawing ==
- ISO 128 for the general principles of presentation in technical drawings
- ISO 216 for paper sizes

== See also ==
- Engineering drawing : Title block
- List of International Organization for Standardization standards
