= Indiana State Fair stage collapse =

Fatal accident in 2011

- The stage roof collapsing onto spectators
- Date: August 13, 2011
- Time: 8:46 PM
- Location: Indianapolis, Indiana, U.S.; 39°49′47.82″N 86°8′3.68″W
- Cause: Inadequate capacity of lateral load resisting system and a wind gust from a severe thunderstorm
- Deaths: 7
- Injuries: 58

At 8:46 p.m, on August 13, 2011, a wind gust from an approaching severe thunderstorm hit the roof structure of a temporary outdoor concert stage at the Indiana State Fair in Indianapolis, Indiana, U.S., and caused its collapse. The structure landed among a crowd of spectators, killing seven people and injuring fifty-eight others.

The members of Sugarland were in a tour bus preparing for the concert as part of their Incredible Machine tour. Opening act Sara Bareilles had completed her performance prior to the incident.

== Events leading up to the collapse ==
=== Discussions about delaying the show ===
Throughout the day and evening of the concert, the National Weather Service issued notices and warnings predicting strong thunderstorms. Messages about the forecasts were relayed to various State Fair personnel via an automated text-messaging system.

At 8:00 p.m., Cindy Hoye, Executive Director for the Indiana State Fair Commission, held a meeting to discuss what effect the weather forecast would have on the 8:45 p.m. start time for the Sugarland show. Members of the meeting were told that the storm was forecast to arrive at 9:15 p.m., 30 minutes after the concert was to begin. Hoye wanted to delay the show until the weather had passed.

An official took this message to Sugarland's managers, who said they preferred to go on with the show as scheduled and only stop if weather conditions worsened. The managers only knew about the rain, not the lightning, wind, and hail that were expected. They decided to start the show just 5 minutes late (8:50 p.m.) to allow the band time to warm up.

When the band's decision got back to Hoye, she accepted, assuming the band had the final say. Since the storm was to arrive at around 9:15 p.m., there would still be time for them to perform some of the show.

=== Evacuation announcement and concert cancellation ===
At around 8:30 p.m., Hoye encountered State Police Captain Brad Weaver. Weaver was concerned that the approaching weather would pose a threat to public safety, and recommended that Hoye cancel the show. He also recommended they put together an evacuation plan for the crowd. Hoye directed her staff to make preparations for an evacuation.

At 8:39 p.m., the National Weather Service issued a severe thunderstorm warning indicating that hail with a diameter of 1 inch (25 mm) and winds over 60 miles per hour (97 km/h) were expected. This warning was not communicated to either Hoye or Weaver, who were still anticipating the storm arriving at 9:15 p.m.

At 8:40 p.m., Hoye dictated a message to an announcer, who delivered it to the audience at 8:45 p.m. The announcer stated that a storm was approaching but that the show would go on. He gave instructions on how to evacuate to the buildings nearby in case conditions got worse, but there was no directive to actually proceed with an evacuation. Following the announcement, just moments before the collapse, the audience were seen evacuating to the nearest exits as the weather got worse.

=== Collapse ===
After hearing an announcement that the show was going to continue, Weaver confronted Hoye and reiterated that the show should be called off. The two agreed, and began walking to the stage to make a second announcement. However, at 8:46 p.m., a wind gust hit the stage structure, causing the stage to collapse before they were able to announce the evacuation.

Tammy Vandam, 42; Glenn Goodrich, 49; Alina BigJohny, 23; and Christina Santiago, 29, all died at the scene. Stagehand Nathan Byrd, 51; Jennifer Haskell, 22; and Meagan Toothman, 24, later died in the hospital from their injuries.

== Investigation ==
The Indiana State Fair Commission hired the engineering firm Thornton Tomasetti to lead the technical investigation into why the stage collapsed. The same firm had investigated the collapse of the World Trade Center on 9/11 and also the Interstate 35W bridge collapse in Minneapolis.

In addition, the public safety and crisis management firm Witt Associates was hired to investigate the fair's preparedness and response to the incident. James Lee Witt, the company's CEO, was the director of the Federal Emergency Management Agency (FEMA) for the Clinton Administration.

=== Cause of the collapse ===
One of the Jersey barriers used as ballast for the stage roof guy lines after it was pulled down a flight of stairs by the collapsing stage (background). The lack of resistance provided by these barriers was found to be the primary cause of the collapse.

According to the final incident report released by Thornton Tomasetti:

The failure ... was due to the inadequate capacity of the lateral load resisting system, which was comprised of guy lines connected to concrete "Jersey barrier" ballast.

The concrete barriers used as anchors for the guy lines were not fixed in place; they resisted loading only by friction with the ground and through their own weight—about 4,200 pounds (1,900 kg). Just before the collapse, wind loading caused several of the barriers to slide or pivot from their original positions, allowing the top of the truss structure to lean toward the crowd. The subsequent bending forces within the support columns were too large, and the structure collapsed under its own weight. Measurements indicated that the total weight was 70,000 pounds (32,000 kg).

Multiple components within the lateral load resisting system were found to be insufficient:

- Ballast system: The Jersey barriers, as arranged at the time of collapse, could only resist winds ranging from 25 to 43 miles per hour (40 to 69 km/h), depending on wind direction; however, the actual wind speed was about 59 mph (95 km/h). The building code required the structure to withstand winds of 68 mph (109 km/h).
- Guy lines: Even if the ballast had been sufficient, the structure still would have failed, because the synthetic webbing ratchet straps and wire rope used as guy lines would have been loaded beyond their capacity.
- Structure connections: The fin plate connections attaching the guy lines to the top of the truss structure also had insufficient strength and would have failed.

The separation and billowing of the roof tarp was found not to be a cause of the collapse, because the collapse sequence had already begun before the membrane added additional forces.

=== Design, construction, and inspection ===
The report also pointed out a number of procedural factors that either contributed to the structural problems or prevented them from being discovered:

- The catalog provided by the structure manufacturer, James Thomas Engineering, did not contain enough information to properly design the structure.
- When the same structure was reviewed by an engineer from James Thomas Engineering in 2010, the analysis was inadequate.
- There was no engineering review of the Sugarland rigging plot before it was affixed to the structure.
- The installation of the structure deviated from the directions provided in the analysis by the engineer from James Thomas Engineering (in addition to the analysis being inadequate).
- There was no engineering review of the structure after it was erected by Mid America Sound Corporation.
- The State of Indiana governing code waived important requirements for temporary structures such as the one that collapsed.
- The Indiana State Fair Commission staff did not have the appropriate information or knowledge about the structure to evaluate its use during the fair.

=== Preparedness, communication, and response ===
Several issues were found with the level of preparedness and the actions of State Fair officials and Sugarland representatives on the evening of the incident that contributed to the number of casualties:

- The Indiana State Fair Commission had taken some steps to prepare for an emergency, but the overall state of preparedness was not adequate for an event the size of the Indiana State Fair.
- The Indiana State Fair Commission also lacked formal protocols for delaying, postponing, or cancelling a production. As a result, it was not clear who had the authority to make decisions regarding the concert.
- Weather forecasts were not properly communicated.
- The response to the incident, however, was successful, with all severely injured patients being transported to hospitals within 80 minutes.

== Legal cases ==
Several lawsuits were filed after the event. In 2014, the largest lawsuit (representing multiple plaintiffs and multiple defendants) was settled for $50 million in damages. In that lawsuit, the State of Indiana settled for paying $11 million, and the other defendants (including Live Nation and Sugarland) settled for paying the balance of the $50 million award ($39 million). However, defendant ESG Security, Inc. (who lost one of its own employees in the collapse) denied liability and did not settle. On September 14, 2015, ESG won a summary judgement and was dismissed from the case. ESG was the only defendant dismissed from the case via the summary judgment process.

== See also ==
- 1963 Indiana State Fairgrounds Coliseum gas explosion
- Belvidere Apollo Theatre collapse – another concert disaster involving predicted imminent severe weather
