= PKS 2215+020 =

Quasar in the constellation Aquarius

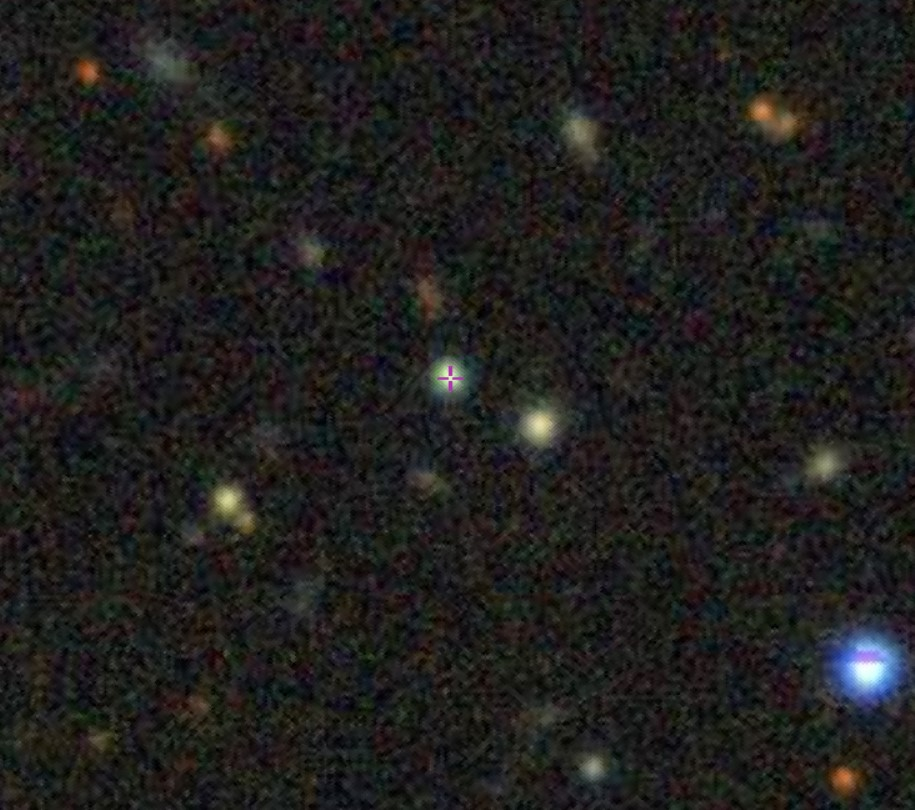
- PKS 2215+020 seen by DESI Legacy Surveys

Observation data (J2000.0 epoch)
- Constellation: Aquarius
- Right ascension: 22h 17m 48.238s
- Declination: +02d 20m 10.71s
- Redshift: 3.570000
- Heliocentric radial velocity: 1,070,259 km/s
- Distance: 11.6 Gly (light travel time distance)
- Apparent magnitude (V): 0.54
- Apparent magnitude (B): 0.43
- Surface brightness: 21.5

Characteristics
- Type: RLQ, AGN1

Other designations
- NVSS J221748+022011, FIRST J221748.2+022011, PGC 2831265, 87GB J221515.4+020507, TXS 2215+020, PMN J2217+0220

PKS 2215+020, known as PMN J2217+0220, is a quasar located in the constellation Aquarius. Its redshift is 3.57, meaning the object is located 11.6 billion light-years away from Earth. It is classified as a flat-spectrum radio quasar.

== Characteristics ==
PKS 2215+020 is an optically faint and radio-loud quasar (S_{5 GHz} = 0.50.6 Jy). Included as part of the Parkes Half-Jansky Flat Spectrum Sample, the quasar has a corresponding linear scale of 3.38 h^{−1} pc mas^{−1} and deceleration parameter of q_{0} = 0.5, which its radio spectral index of 2215+020 is a 5 GHz divided by 2.7 GHz = -0.15 (Sv ∞ vx). From X-ray emission observation with ROSAT in 1998, a minimum evidence for possible elongation along the P.A. = 60°-70° is found.

PKS 2215+020 is a blazar, a type of active galaxy shooting out a jet towards the direction of Earth, according to researchers who studied its jet components. They found out that the quasar contains a nearly proper motion (0.02 mas/yr) superluminal jet about two times the speed of light. PKS 2215+020 has a delta of =11.5 for the Doppler-boosting factor, which they found that the inner relativistic jet inclined within 2 degrees to line of sight, with a Lorentz factor of Gamma=6 bulk.

Further observations from the VSOP observation, found out the jet in PKS 2215+020 has an interesting morphology. They observed that extent of the jet is remarkable showing >80 mas, 250 h^{−1} pc. Moreover, the jet structures observed in 2215+020 are 10 time larger compared to quasars at z > 3 observed with VLBI, suggesting the jet has a working surface.

== Black hole ==
The supermassive black hole in the center of PKS 2215+020 has an estimated 4 billion solar masses (M_{☉}). According to resolution images of the quasar, researchers found there is rich core-jet structure, unusually large, based on the linear scales from 5 h^{−1} to 300 h^{−1} pc (H0 = 100 h km s-1 Mpc-1). This makes PKS 2215+020 to have the longest jet observed, so far at a redshift greater than 3. Through comparing similarities with the VLA and ROSAT observations, an extended radio/X-ray halo surrounding PKS 2215+020 is present.
