= Instrument schedule =

In theatrical productions, an instrument schedule is a listing of all the lighting instruments and information about them used in a show. The instruments are organized by their position on-stage, and is the distinguishing characteristic between an instrument schedule and a channel hookup or similar paperwork. The instrument schedule includes all information about every instrument, including hanging location, instrument number, type, wattage, color, focus area, circuit, dimmer and templates, along with any additional information. The variety of information included in an instrument schedule generally makes this more "complete" than other generated paperwork, and as such the schedule is often considered the "master" sheet. The master electrician uses the information contained in the instrument schedule along with the light plot to direct the hanging of the instruments.

== Conventions ==
Typically the instrument schedule is organized first by hanging location. Common hanging locations (or lighting positions) in theater include electrics, apron pipes, front of house positions, booms and ladders. Within each position, instruments are numbered in the order they are located on the pipe. The standard practice is to label instruments from stage left to right (for battens), and top to bottom for booms and ladders, although some lighting designers choose to label from stage right to stage left. This is a matter of personal preference; it is only important that numbering is consistent. This instrument number (or unit number) is used to sort the instruments in each lighting position on the instrument schedule.

== Software ==
While instrument schedules have traditionally been made by hand or on spreadsheets, there are now several industry specific software based means to generate them. Lightwright is a spreadsheet program that will print nicely formatted instrument schedules. Computer-aided design (CAD) software such as AutoCAD and VectorWorks used for creating a light plot can often export lighting information into forms that other programs can use. This way the lighting designer only needs to draft the light plot and the instrument schedule and other paperwork can be generated automatically.
