= Lightwright =

Stage lighting software

- Screenshot of Lightwright
- Developer(s): John McKernon
- Stable release: 6.0.16 / 2016
- Operating system: Microsoft Windows XP or newer, Mac OS X v10.4 or higher
- Type: Entertainment, Theatrical
- License: Proprietary
- Website: http://www.Lightwright.com

Lightwright is a proprietary software that manages theatrical lighting data and paperwork. Developed and maintained by John McKernon, the Lightwright software combines a relational database with a graphical user interface in support of user generated instrument schedules, channel hookups, and other lighting paperwork from a single spreadsheet/database. It also provides error-checking and lighting-specific data entry shortcuts. In the U.S. professional theater, Lightwright is the industry standard lighting database program. The software is widely used in the production of Broadway and other live entertainment shows, and across a number of educational and arts institutions.

== History ==
Lightwright 1.0 was written in QuickBASIC for MS-DOS and released in August 1988. Lightwright 2.0 was released in January 1995 for both Microsoft Windows and MacOS, and written in Visual Basic and ZBASIC respectively. The subsequent two versions—Lightwright 3.0 (1998) and Lightwright 4.0 (2003)—were maintained using separate code (Visual Basic / ZBASIC) for each operating system. Lightwright 5.0 (2009) was written using RealStudio (now Xojo) for both Windows and Mac, and introduced Data Exchange in support of simplified data sharing between Lightwright and Vectorworks. Lightwright 6.0 (2016) introduced a Consol Link which, through the OSC [Open Sound Control] protocol, provides integration with ETC Eos lighting consoles. Lightwright 6.0 also introduced an Avery label database, with label design and printing capabilities.

== See also ==
- Lighting Designer
- Stage lighting
