= Linear scale =

Graphical representation of the scale of a map

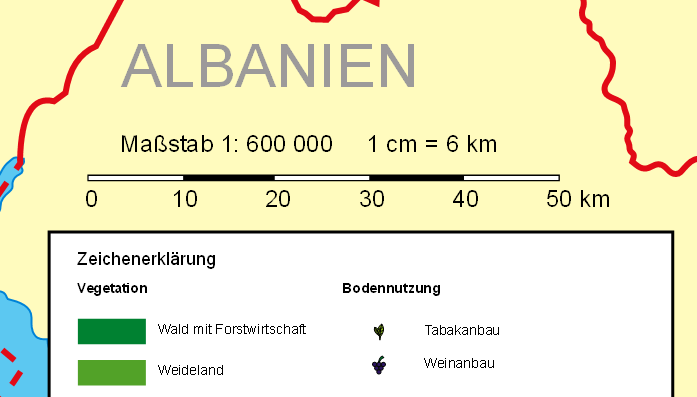
A linear scale showing that one centimetre on the map corresponds to six kilometres

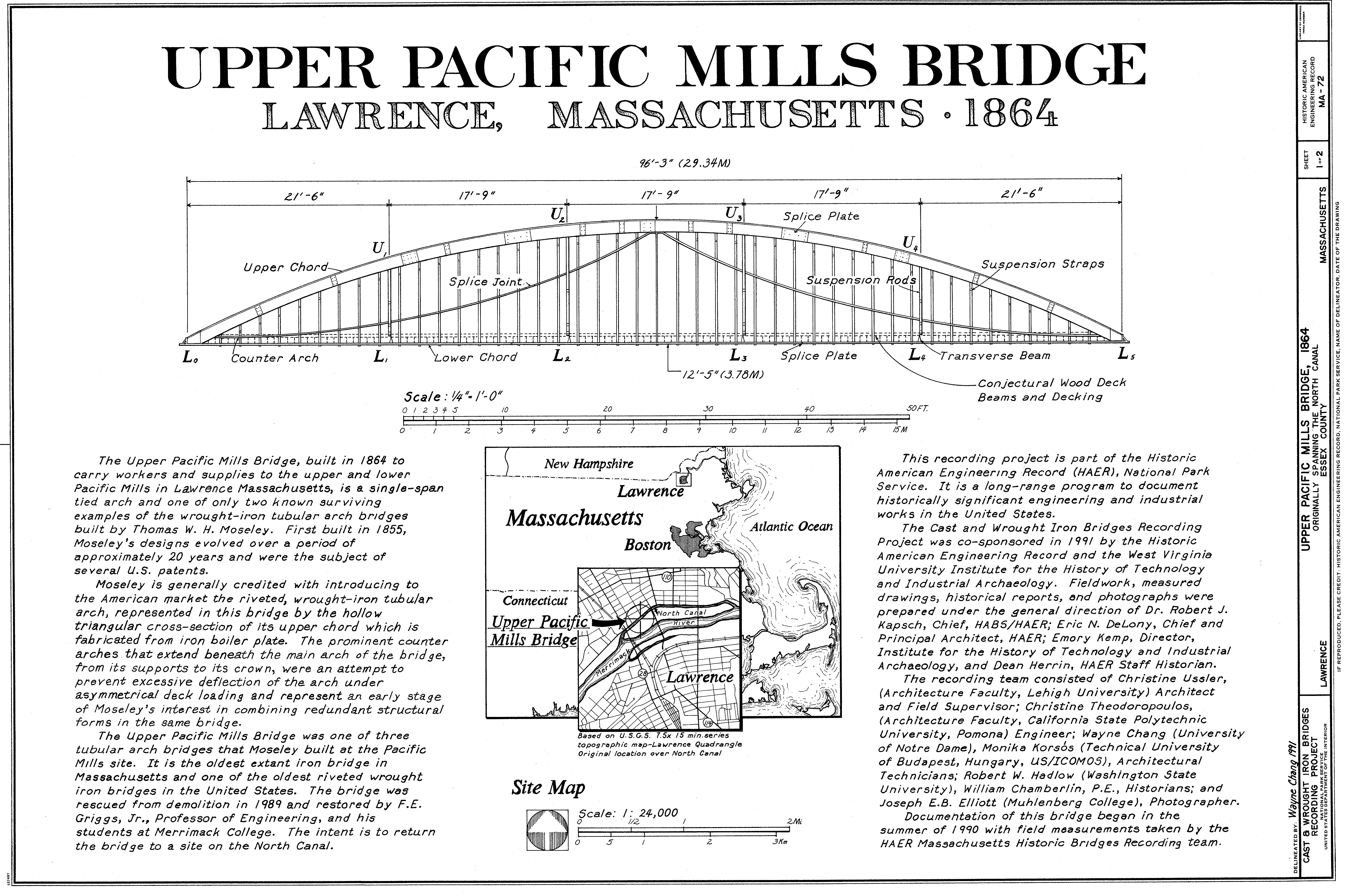
Linear scale in both feet and metres in the center of an engineering drawing. The drawing was made 130 years after the bridge was built.

A linear scale, also called a bar scale, scale bar, graphic scale, or graphical scale, is a means of visually showing the scale of a map, nautical chart, engineering drawing, or architectural drawing. A scale bar is a common element of map layouts.

On large scale maps and charts, those covering a small area, and engineering and architectural drawings, the linear scale can be very simple, a line marked at intervals to show the distance on the earth or object which the distance on the scale represents. A person using the map can use a pair of dividers (or, less precisely, two fingers) to measure a distance by comparing it to the linear scale. The length of the line on the linear scale is equal to the distance represented on the earth multiplied by the map or chart's scale.

In most projections, scale varies with latitude, so on small scale maps, covering large areas and a wide range of latitudes, the linear scale must show the scale for the range of latitudes covered by the map. One of these is shown below.

Since most nautical charts are constructed using the Mercator projection whose scale varies substantially with latitude, linear scales are not used on charts with scales smaller than approximately 1/80,000. Mariners generally use the nautical mile, which, because a nautical mile is approximately equal to a minute of latitude, can be measured against the latitude scale at the sides of the chart.

While linear scales are used on architectural and engineering drawings, particularly those that are drawn after the subject has been built, many such drawings do not have a linear scale and are marked "Do Not Scale Drawing" in recognition of the fact that paper size changes with environmental changes and only dimensions that are specifically shown on the drawing can be used reliably in precise manufacturing.

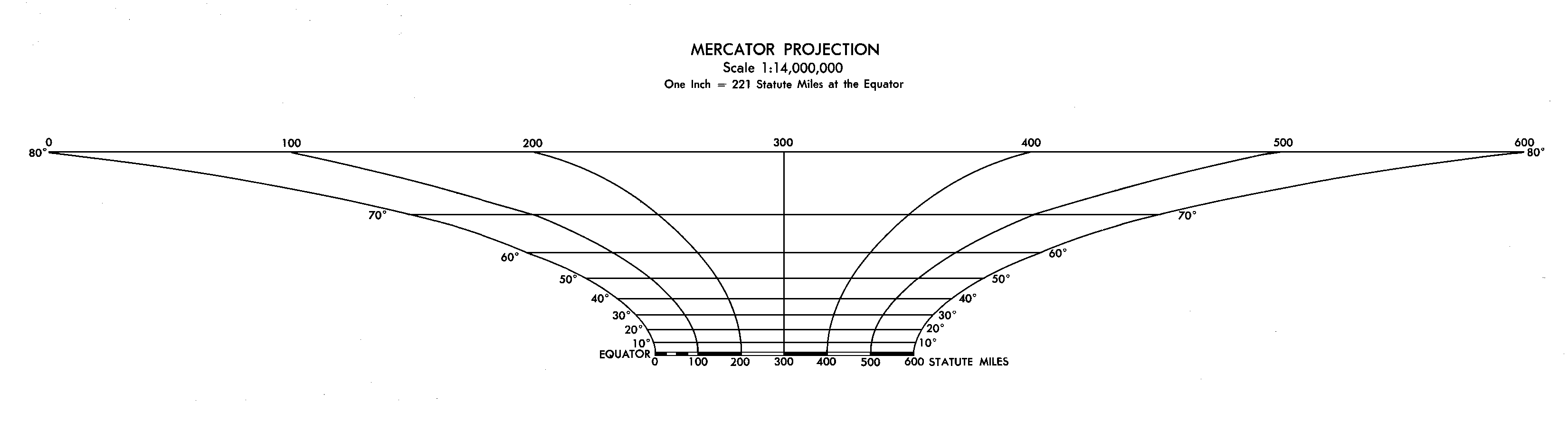
The scale from a large world map, showing, graphically, the change of scale with latitude. Each unit on the map at the equator represents the same distance on the earth as 5.9 units at 80° latitude.

== Nomenclature ==
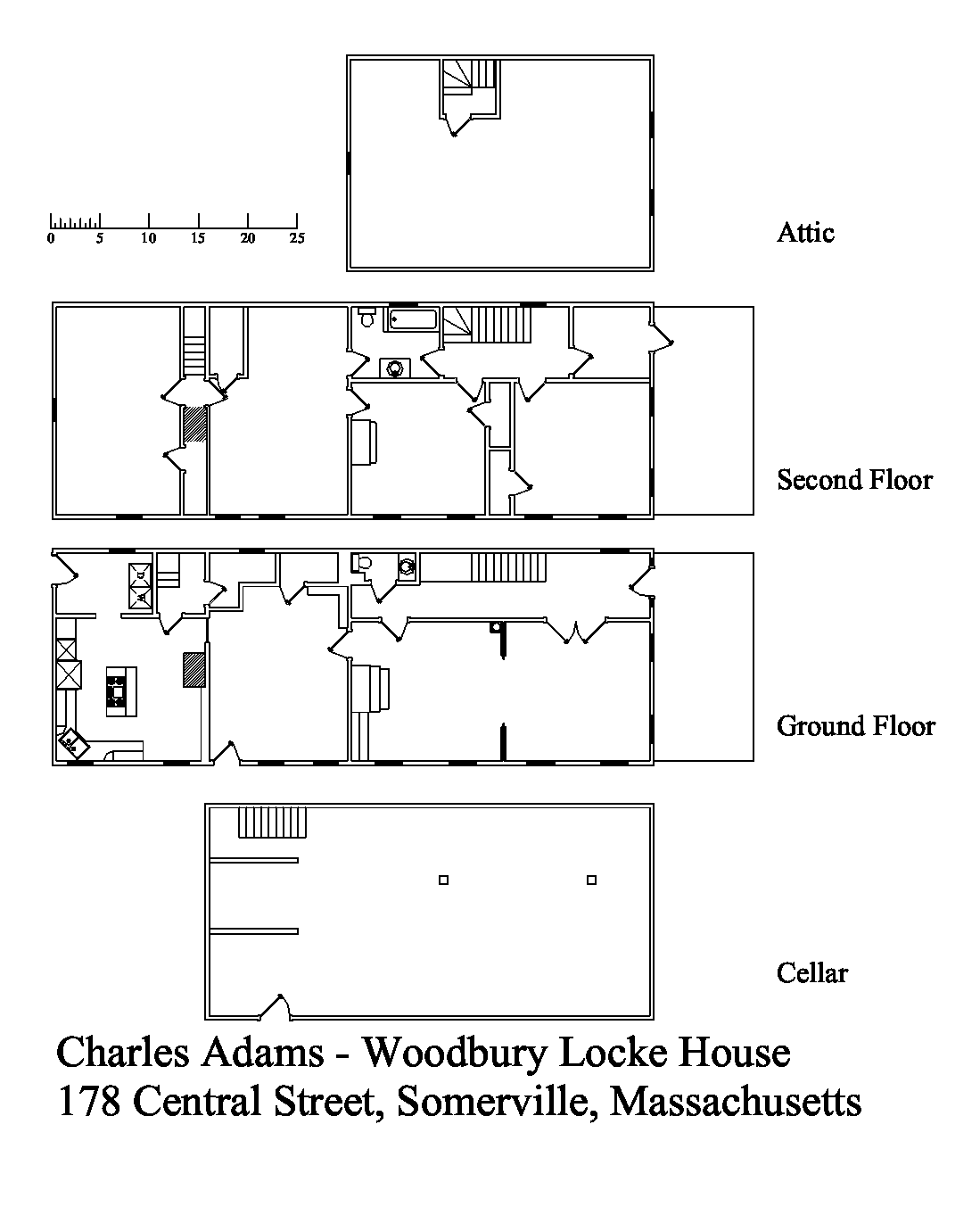
An architectural drawing with a simple linear scale showing feet and half feet.

The terms "bar scale", "graphic scale", "graphical scale", "linear scale", and "scale" are all used. Bowditch defined only "bar scale" in its 1962 Glossary, but added a reference to "graphic scale" by its 2002 edition. Dutton used both terms in 1978. The International Hydrographic Organization's Chart No. 1 uses only "linear scale". The British Admiralty's Mariner's Handbook uses "scale" to describe a linear scale and avoids confusion by using "natural scale" for the fraction defined at scale (map).

== See also ==
- Engineer's scale
- Logarithmic scale (useful e.g. when the data covers a large range of values)
