= Channel hookup =

In theatrical productions, the channel hookup is a printout of a lighting database such as Lightwright that organizes all the lighting information for a stage show by the channel number associated with the lighting equipment and limits the information associated with a particular lighting instrument such that a designer or electrician can access needed information rapidly and efficiently.

Lighting equipment is often organized by lighting system thereby granting coherence to consecutive channel numbers. Channels 1 through 10 might be Frontlight while 21 through 30 could be Sidelight from left. In Repertory Opera and other large venues channel numbers are often granted to lighting equipment by position as the purpose of the light will change from show to show.

A Channel Hookup will commonly include Channel, Dimmer, Color, Template and Purpose information.

Electronic Theatre Controls has an Example online.
