= Engineering Drawing (book) =

1922 manual

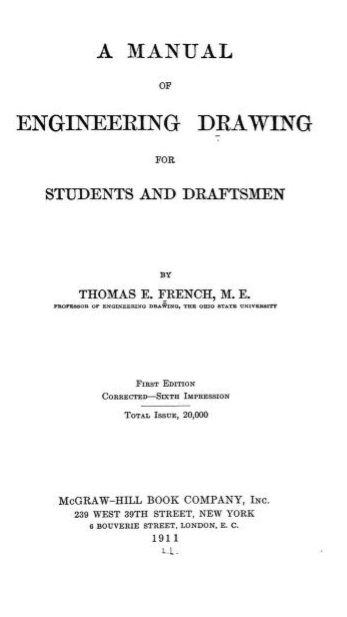
- Title page for A Manual of Engineering Drawing for Students and Draftsman (1911)
- Author: Thomas Ewing French
- Language: English
- Genre: Non-fiction
- Publisher: McGraw-Hill Book Company
- Publication date: 1911

Engineering Drawing by Thomas Ewing French (1871-1944), Mech. Eng., OSU 1895, also known as A Manual of Engineering Drawing for Students and Draftsman, was first published in 1911 by McGraw-Hill Book Company. It appeared in fourteen editions and was last published in 1993. The title and author remained the same through the first six editions. French died during the publication years of the Sixth Edition, so the Seventh Edition was revised by his colleague at Ohio State University, Charles J. Vierck. The Eighth through Tenth editions had the same title and were also authored by Charles J. Vierck. For the Eleventh and Twelfth editions, the book title changed to Engineering Drawing and Graphic Technology. Following the death of Vierck in 1980, the Thirteenth and Fourteenth Editions were additionally authored by Robert J. Foster, Penn State University.

In North America, this textbook was widely used for education of drafters, engineers, and architects.

== History ==
In 1910, Martin M. Foss, a traveling representative of the newly organized McGraw-Hill Book Company, solicited Thomas E. French to produce "a text that will be widely accepted as the standard work on the subject." A Manual of Engineering Drawing for Students and Draftsmen was published in 1911. He was assisted by Assistant Professor Robert Meiklejohn, Instructors Owen E. Williams, Arthur C. Harper, Cree Sheets, Frederick W. Ives, William D. Turnbull and William J. Norris, which were the entire teaching staff of the Department of Engineering Graphics at OSU. The book became a classic of its field and was published in multiple editions. It once held the American publishers record as the best selling of all college textbooks. Martin Foss later became President of the McGraw-Hill.

The Ohio State University Monthly, in February 1935, stated, "Not only is he famous as the 'father of the Stadium' idea, but his textbook, A Manual of Engineering Drawing, has taken the name of Professor Thomas E. French, Mech. E., '95 into 400 colleges and universities throughout the world. It is the most widely used text on engineering extant.".

This book became a best seller for the McGraw Hill publishing company, and reportedly its sales kept the company from bankruptcy during the depression.

== Films ==
Starting with the Seventh Edition in 1947, 16mm sound motion picture films were created to complement the instruction found in the textbook. This practice continued through the Eleventh Edition.

Text-Films for the Seventh Edition:

McGraw-Hill Text-Films For Engineering Drawing (10 min, According to Plan: Introduction to Engineering Drawing), For Chap. 1

McGraw-Hill Text-Films For Engineering Drawing (20 min, Orthographic Projection), For Chaps. 6 and 7

McGraw-Hill Text-Films For Engineering Drawing (20 min, Auxiliary Views: Single Auxiliaries), For Chap. 8

McGraw-Hill Text-Films For Engineering Drawing (15 min, Auxiliary Views: Double Auxiliaries), For Chap. 8

McGraw-Hill Text-Films For Engineering Drawing (15 min, Sections and Conventions), For Chap. 9

McGraw-Hill Text-Films For Engineering Drawing (15 min, Drawings and the Shop), For Chap. 10

McGraw-Hill Text-Films For Engineering Drawing (Silent filmstrip, Dimensioning Techniques), For Chaps. 11 and 12

McGraw-Hill Text-Films For Engineering Drawing (20 min, Selection of Dimensions), For Chaps. 11 and 12

Text-Films for the Eighth Edition:

McGraw-Hill Text-Films For Engineering Drawing (10 min, According to Plan: Introduction to Engineering Drawing), For Chap. 1

McGraw-Hill Text-Films For Engineering Drawing (20 min, Orthographic Projection), For Chaps. 6, 7, 8, and 9

McGraw-Hill Text-Films For Engineering Drawing (20 min, Auxiliary Views: Single Auxiliaries), For Chap. 10

McGraw-Hill Text-Films For Engineering Drawing (15 min, Auxiliary Views: Double Auxiliaries), For Chap. 11

McGraw-Hill Text-Films For Engineering Drawing (15 min, Sections and Conventions), For Chap. 13

McGraw-Hill Text-Films For Engineering Drawing (18 min, Developments, For Chap. 15

McGraw-Hill Text-Films For Engineering Drawing (12 min, Pictorial Sketching), For Chap. 18

McGraw-Hill Text-Films For Engineering Drawing (15 min, The Drawings and the Shop), For Chap. 19

McGraw-Hill Text-Films For Engineering Drawing (Silent filmstrip, Dimensioning Techniques), For Chaps. 20 and 21

McGraw-Hill Text-Films For Engineering Drawing (20 min, Selection of Dimensions), For Chaps. 20 and 21

Text-Films for the Ninth, Tenth, and Eleventh Editions:

McGraw-Hill Text-Films For Engineering Drawing (9 min, According to Plan), For Chap. 1

McGraw-Hill Text-Films For Engineering Drawing (18 min, Orthographic Projection), For Chap. 5

McGraw-Hill Text-Films For Engineering Drawing (11 min, Pictorial Sketching), For Chap. 6

McGraw-Hill Text-Films For Engineering Drawing (23 min, Auxiliary Views: Single Auxiliaries), For Chap. 7

McGraw-Hill Text-Films For Engineering Drawing (13 min, Auxiliary Views: Double Auxiliaries), For Chap. 7

McGraw-Hill Text-Films For Engineering Drawing (15 min, Sections and Conventions), For Chap. 8

McGraw-Hill Text-Films For Engineering Drawing (11 min, Simple Developments), For Chap. 9

McGraw-Hill Text-Films For Engineering Drawing (11 min, Oblique Cones and Transition Developments), For Chap. 9

McGraw-Hill Text-Films For Engineering Drawing (15 min, Drawings and the Shop), For Chap. 10

McGraw-Hill Text-Films For Engineering Drawing (18 min, Selection of Dimensions), For Chap. 11

== Accompanying Books ==
The success of the textbook enabled others to write accompanying books of additional practice questions or problems.

Quiz Questions (Russ), 1943 (Accompany Sixth Edition)

Quiz Questions (Russ), 1948 (Accompany Seventh Edition)

Quiz Questions (Russ), 1953 (Accompany Eighth Edition)

Keyed to A Manual of Engineering Drawing for Students and Draftsmen and Fundamentals of Engineering Drawing:

Problems in engineering drawing (Levens, Edstrom), 1944

Problems in engineering drawing (Levens, Edstrom), 1945

Problems in engineering drawing (Levens, Edstrom), 1947

Problems in engineering drawing (Levens, Edstrom), 1951 (Series III; keyed to 7th edition)

Problems in engineering drawing (Levens, Edstrom), 1960 (Series V; keyed to 9th edition and 1st edition)

Engineering and Graphic Technology Problems Book (Rogers), 1978 (keyed to Twelfth Edition)

Engineering and Graphic Technology Problems Book II (Rogers), 1988 (keyed to Thirteenth Edition)

Engineering and Graphic Technology Problems Book III (Rogers), 1993 (keyed to Fourteenth Edition)

== Publication Data ==
This publication data was derived from the copyright information published in the front of each book, except where noted.

=== First Edition ===
289 pages (includes Index) - 35,000 copies

LCCN 11-020537

Impression	Month	Year	Printed	Total Issue	Author
First	August	1911	4,000		French
Second	October	1911		4,000	French
Third	August	1912			French
Fourth	August	1913			French
Fifth	March	1914			French
Sixth	October	1914	4,000	20,000	French
Seventh	November	1915	2,500	24,000	French
Eighth	September	1916	5,000	26,500	French
Ninth	June	1917	1,000	31,500	French
Tenth	November	1917	2,500	32,500	French

=== Second Edition ===
329 pages (includes Appendix and Index) - 108,000 copies

LCCN 18-016246

Impression	Month	Year	Printed	Total Issue	Author
First	July	1918	7,500	35,000	French
Second	October	1918	10,500	42,500	French
Third	October	1918	5,000	53,000	French
Fourth	June	1919	5,000	58,000	French
Fifth	September	1919	5,000	63,000	French
Sixth	October	1919	15,000	68,000	French
Seventh	May	1920	5,000	83,000	French
Eighth	October	1920	15,000	88,000	French
Ninth	July	1921	3,000	103,000	French
Tenth	February	1922	12,500	106,000	French
Eleventh	May	1922	16,000	118,500	French
Twelfth	May	1923	8,500	134,500	French

=== Third Edition ===
409 pages (includes Appendix and Index) - 96,000 copies

LCCN 24-012758

Impression	Month	Year	Printed	Total Issue	Author
First	May	1924	9,500	143,000	French
Second	September	1924	2,000	152,500	French
Third	January	1925	13,500	154,500	French
Fourth	June	1925		168,000	French
Fifth	September	1925			French
Sixth	June	1926	5,000	188,000	French
Seventh	September	1926	18,000	193,000	French
Eighth	June	1927	15,000	211,000	French
Ninth	June	1928		226,000	French
Tenth					French

=== Fourth Edition ===
466 pages (includes Appendix and Index) - 106,000 copies

LCCN 29-013849

Impression	Month	Year	Printed	Total Issue	Author
First	June	1929	9,500	239,000	French
Second	August	1929	5,000	248,500	French
Third	October	1929	19,500	253,500	French
Fourth	January	1930	10,000	273,000	French
Fifth	September	1930	25,000	283,000	French
Sixth	May	1931		308,000	French
Seventh	September	1932			French
Eighth	March	1934		328,500	French
Ninth	September	1934			French
Tenth	October	1934		356,000	French

=== Fifth Edition ===
481 pages (includes Appendix and Index) - 148,000 copies

LCCN 35-027219

Impression	Month	Year	Printed	Total Issue	Author
First	April	1935		345,000	French
Second					French
Third					French
Fourth	December	1935			French
Fifth					French
Sixth	February	1937			French
Seventh					French
Eighth	April	1938			French
Ninth	June	1939			French
Tenth					French
Eleventh	June	1940			French
Twelfth	September	1940			French
Thirteenth	November	1940			French
Fourteenth					French
Fifteenth					French
Sixteenth					French

=== Sixth Edition ===
622 pages (includes Appendix and Index) - 439,700 copies

LCCN 41-008971

In 1944, the War Department used this textbook as one of their Education Manuals (EM 961)

ImRefession	Month	Year	Printed	Total Issue	Author
First	May	1941		493.000	French
Second	September	1941			French
Third	March	1942			French
Fourth	May	1942			French
Fifth	September	1942			French
Sixth	January	1943			French
Seventh	July	1943			French
Eighth	August	1944			French
Ninth	March	1945			French
Tenth	September	1945			French
Eleventh	November	1945			French
Twelfth	February	1946			French
Thirteenth		1946			French
Fourteenth	December	1946			French
Fifteenth	January	1947			French

=== Seventh Edition ===
694 pages (includes Appendix and Index) - 302,989 copies

LCCN 47-031042

Impression	Month	Year	Printed	Total Issue	Author
First	August	1947	150,000	932,700	French (Revised by Vierck)
Second			50,000	1,082,700	French (Revised by Vierck)
Third			25,000	1,132,700	French (Revised by Vierck)
Fourth			25,000	1,157,700	French (Revised by Vierck)
Fifth			20,000	1,182,700	French (Revised by Vierck)
Sixth			21,099	1,202,700	French (Revised by Vierck)
Seventh			11,890	1,223,799	French (Revised by Vierck)

=== Eighth Edition ===
715 pages (includes Appendix and Index) - 408,982 copies

LCCN 52-013455

Impression	Month	Year	Printed	Total Issue	Author
First	March	1953		1,235,689	French and Vierck
Second					French and Vierck
Third					French and Vierck
Fourth			10,000	1,329,799	French and Vierck
Fifth			40,000	1,339,799	French and Vierck
Sixth			70,000	1,379,799	French and Vierck
Seventh			70,000	1,449,799	French and Vierck
Eighth				1,519,799	French and Vierck
Ninth					French and Vierck
Tenth					French and Vierck

=== Ninth Edition ===
592 pages; 118 Appendix pages; 16 Index pages

LCCN 59-015458

Impression	Month	Year	Printed	Total Issue	Author
		1960	209,178	1,644,671	French and Vierck

=== Tenth Edition ===
701 pages; 143 Appendix pages; 16 Index pages

LCCN 65-028814

Impression	Month	Year	Printed	Total Issue	Author
		1966		1,853,849	French and Vierck

=== Eleventh Edition ===
787 pages; 143 Appendix pages; 16 Index pages

ISBN 0-07-022157-X; LCCN 70-038135

Impression	Month	Year	Printed	Total Issue	Author
		1972			French and Vierck

=== Twelfth Edition ===
799 pages; 137 Appendix pages; 14 Index pages

ISBN 0-07-022158-8; LCCN 77-014431

Impression	Month	Year	Printed	Total Issue	Author
		1978			French and Vierck

=== Thirteenth Edition ===
737 pages (includes Appendix and Index)

ISBN 0-07-022161-8; LCCN 85-016605

Impression	Month	Year	Printed	Total Issue	Author
		1986			French, Vierck, and Foster

=== Fourteenth Edition ===
745 pages (includes Appendix and Index)

ISBN 0-07-022347-5; LCCN 92-036219

Impression	Month	Year	Printed	Total Issue	Author
		1993			French, Vierck, and Foster
