= Light plot =

Theatrical document

A light plot, lighting plot, or just plot is a document like an architectural blueprint used specifically by theatrical lighting designers to illustrate and communicate the lighting design to the director, other designers, and finally the Master Electrician and electrics crew. The light plot specifies how each lighting instrument should be hung, focused, colored, and connected. Typically, the light plot is supplemented by other paperwork, such as the channel hookup or instrument schedule.

Up until the development of computer-aided drafting (CAD) programs, light plots were hand drawn or drafted on special drafting paper. Though CAD programs and hand drafting require different techniques and methods, the information is presented and used in the same way. In order to be effective, a light plot must:

- Have some uniform scale (typically 1/4"=1'-0" or 1/2"=1'-0").
- Define lighting instrument information such as focus, position, color and circuiting.
- Have a title block and legend containing show information and information on how to identify the symbols on the plot.
- Show the relationship of the lighting instruments to the architecture of the space, scenic elements, and the lighting positions.

== Parts of a Plot ==
=== Plan view ===
The plan view is the primary view of the light plot and contains the most information on the lighting instruments and their locations. As per the design definition, the plan view illustrates how the venue space would appear to someone above it. It contains the relevant architectural information of the venue space, including locations of walls, the floor level, the location of seats and balconies, and occasionally sight lines, as well as the location of each lighting instrument and other relevant hardware, like modular dimmer boxes. The plan must also include information on the electrical systems of the theater, the location of outlets connected to the theater's dimmers and the available lighting positions-rails, booms, side arms, and catwalks. The plan view may also contain scenic information, such as a drawing of the set.

=== Section and elevation view ===
The supplementary (and generally optional) section (side) and elevation (front) views contain much of the same information as the plan view. The section is a cutaway view of the house and stage from either the left or the right. The section line is typically the venue's center line. The elevation is a plot oriented as if viewing the stage from the audience. These supplementary views serve primarily to further illustrate relevant architectural and scenic features, including sight lines. Most commonly, the section and elevation plots feature limited electrical information and are used mainly as a reference for the lighting designer or electrician to identify the purpose of each lighting fixture, especially as to how it interacts with any relevant scenic elements. The elevation and section views might also be provided to the electrics crew as a secondary reference for the positions of lighting instruments.

=== Lighting instruments ===
The instrument layer contains all the information relating to the lighting instruments. This includes:

- The specific location of each lighting instrument is represented by a unique symbol.
- Information on each instrument, including dimmer/channel number, lens size, color gel, and any special augmentations (including color wheels and gobos).
- Special notes for the electrics crew, including specific information on how instruments are hung and fastened.
- Auxiliary Lighting units, such as followspots or a "practicals" (lights which are part of the set, like house lamps, which are used visibly in the performance).

In the past, when plots were completely hand-drafted, a lighting designer would sometimes plot the lighting instruments on a transparent overlay that could be placed over the plan, section, and/or elevation views, therefore allowing the "blank" views (containing only architectural information) to be reused for other lighting configurations. The advent of CAD-based lighting design has made this practice obsolete, though occasionally useful.

The information contained in the lighting instruments section should follow consistent, easy-to-understand rules, which are explained in the key, expediting the electric crew's job of hanging and focusing the fixtures.

=== Title block ===
The title block contains several pieces of key information on the production, including the show title, date, and venue name, as well as the names of the performance's lighting designer and director. The title block also contains the legend, which identifies all of the drafting symbols used in the plot, as well as any special notes.

== Other important lighting paperwork ==
In addition to the light plot, there are a number of other important pieces of paperwork (i.e., dimmer hookup, instrument schedule, and magic sheet) in a complete lighting design. As each part of the lighting design is relevant only to a specific group of technicians, the entire design is generally provided only to the director and master electrician.
