= LED stage lighting =

Lighting technology

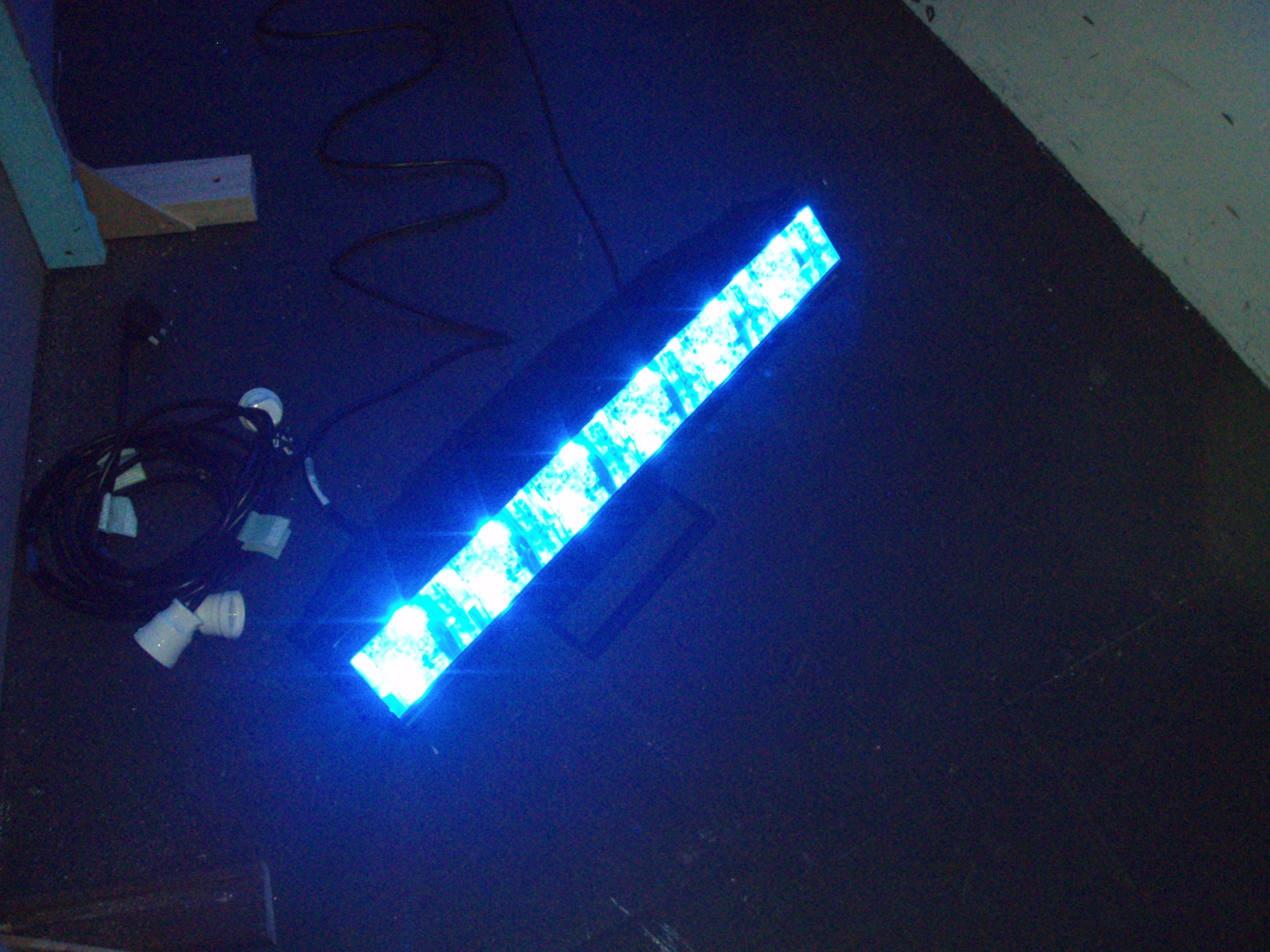
A front view of a Stagebar LED striplight

LED stage lighting is a stage lighting technology that uses light-emitting diodes (LEDs) as a light source. LED instruments are an alternative to traditional stage lights which use halogen lamp or high-intensity discharge lamps. Like other LED instruments, they have high light output with lower power consumption.

== Types ==
LED stage lights come in three main types. PAR cans, striplights and 'moving head' types. In LED PAR cans, a round printed circuit board with LEDs mounted on is used in place of a PAR lamp. Moving head types can either be a bank of LEDs mounted on a yoke or more conventional moving head lights with the bulb replaced with an LED bank.

In fact, there is no such thing as an LED PAR can - it is a misnomer possibly attributed to Chinese manufacturers. As there is no Parabolic Aluminised Reflector in an LED 'PAR', they would be more accurately referred to as 'LED flood lights'.

Many LED fixtures are now made using a small number of high-output diodes that allow the beam to be focused on a "hard edge", allowing full use of gobo/beam effects.

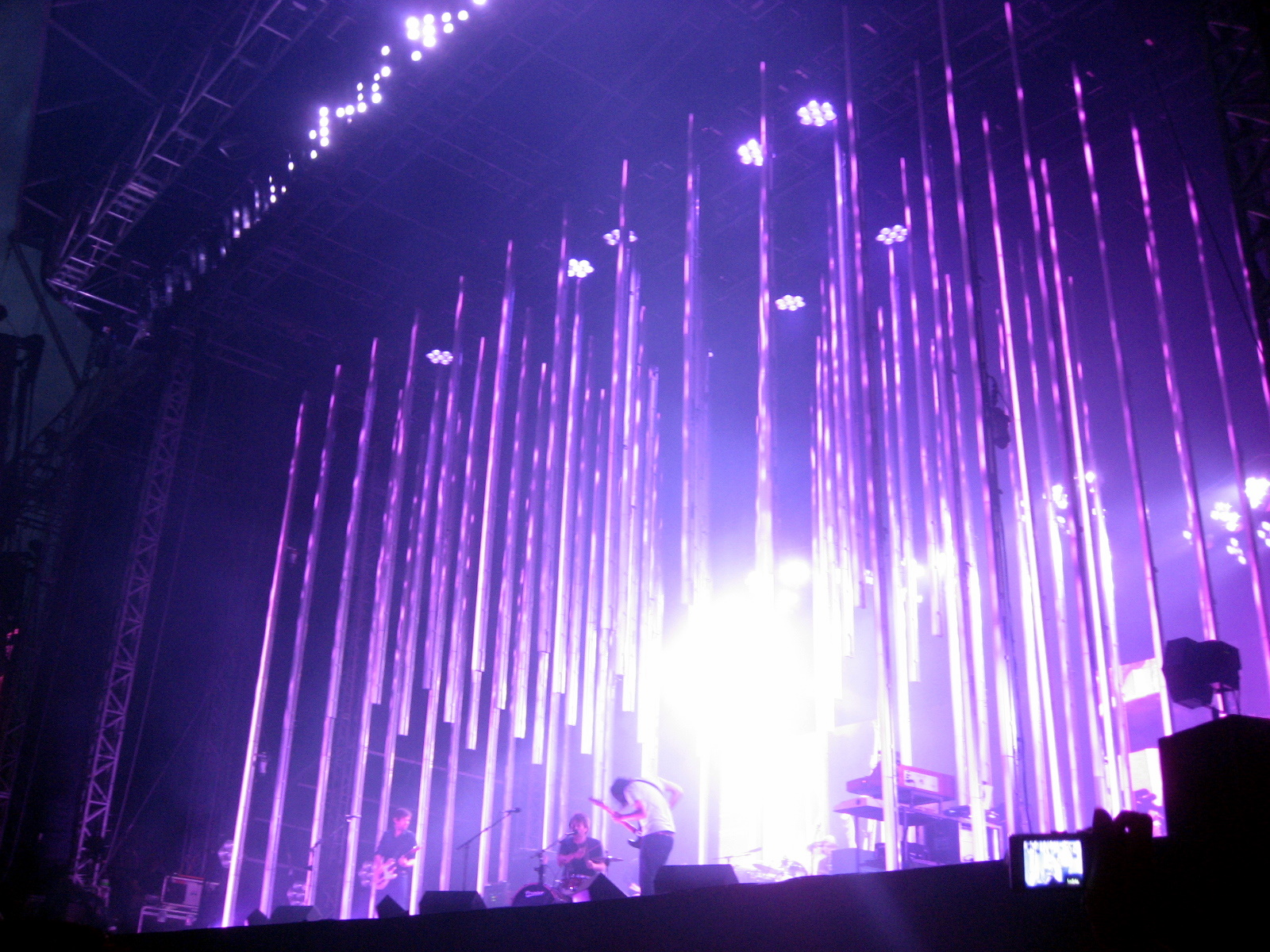
LED lighting instruments used on Radiohead's 2008 tour

== Uses ==
LED instruments can and have been used to replace any conventional lighting fixture, and some shows, such as Radiohead's 2008 tour, have used only LED lighting instruments. In the modern day, most large performances or events that require stage lighting (including theatre, music, opera, corporate events, etc...) use LED fixtures.

== Advantages ==
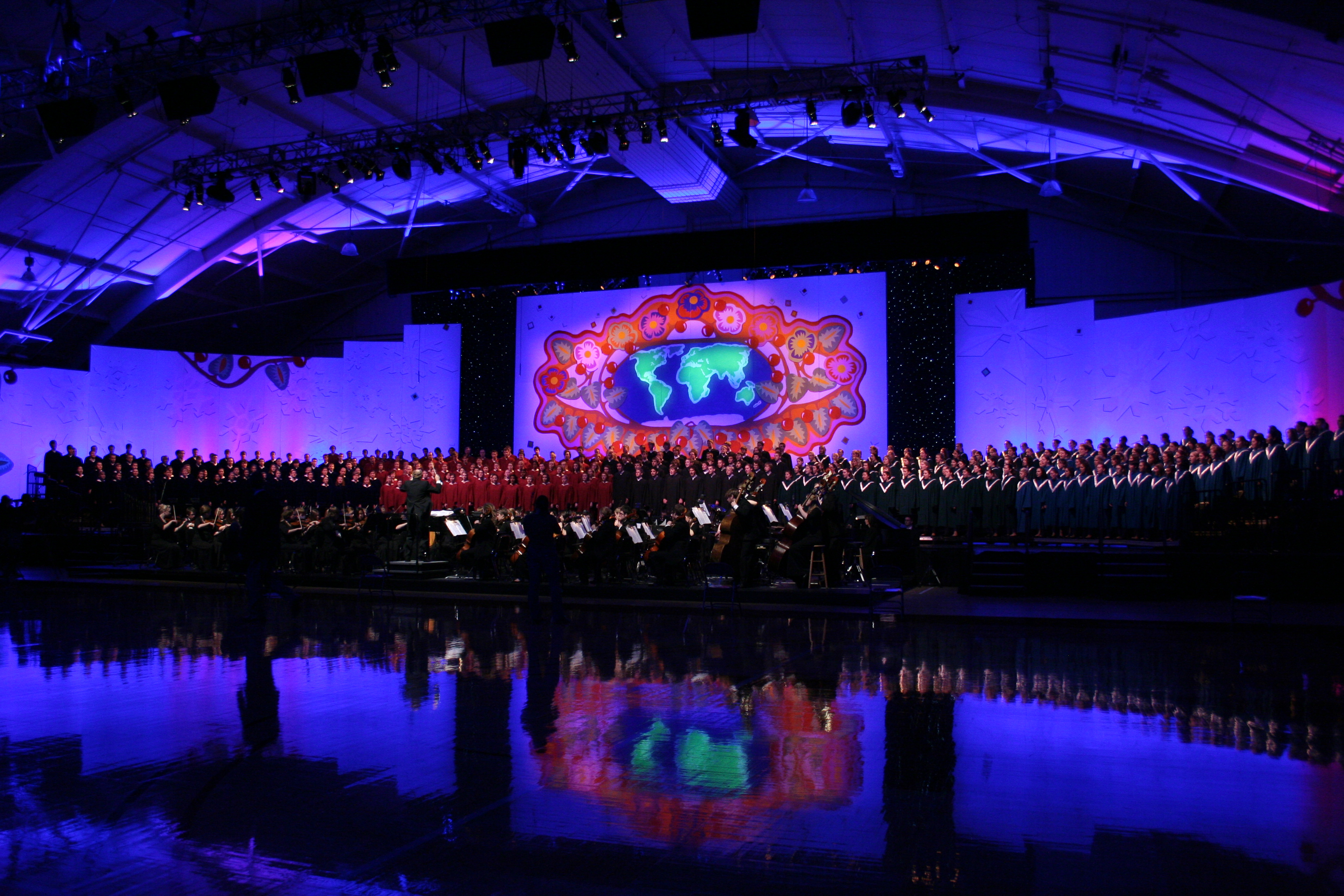
The 2008 Concordia College Christmas Concert used LED instruments to light the murals.

LED instruments can contain a number of different coloured LEDs, often red, green and blue, and different light output colours can be achieved by adjusting the intensity of each LED color group. LED instruments should have a long service life relative to other options, without the expense of colour gel or replacement lamps.

LED instruments are increasingly used for live music events, most notably festivals where they are more visible than conventional lighting under daylight. LED instruments were prominently used for the Live Earth festival as they are regarded as more environmentally friendly as fixture for fixture they use far less power than other lighting.

Another advantage of LED instruments is that they can be controlled directly using DMX and do not require additional dimmers; the intensity of the LEDs being adjusted by circuitry on board the fixture. Because of their low power consumption several units can be daisy chained to one power supply.

Due to low heat output, LED instruments can be used in areas where the high amount of heat conventional stage fixtures put off would not be ideal. For this reason, LED instruments are used to light ice sculptures, especially when lighting the sculptures from within.

== Disadvantages ==
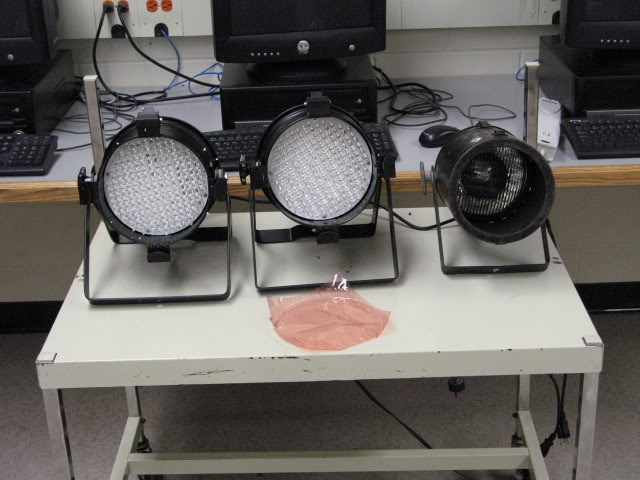

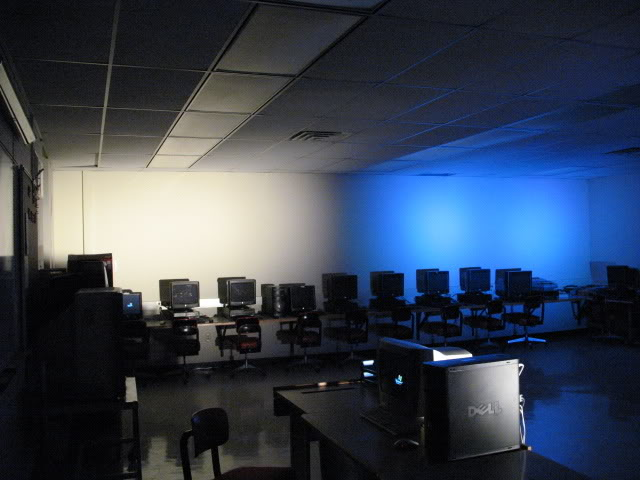

A comparison of two American DJ 64 LED Pro fixtures vs a single PAR-54 GE 300 watt medium flood incandescent.

Because color mixing is done using three or more colors of LEDs, mixed colors will have multiple edges to shadows where different colors are showing; however, several manufacturers have introduced instruments that group three or more LEDs behind a single lens to make the multiple shadow lines less noticeable, as well as ellipsoidal fixtures with lenses that create an almost entirely homogeneous beam.

== See also ==
- Solid-state lighting
- LED lamp
- LED
- LED Strip Light
