= ISO 128 =

International standard for technical drawings

ISO 128 is the International Organization for Standardization (ISO) standard covering the general principles of presentation in technical drawings, specifically the graphical representation of objects on technical drawings.

== Overview ==
Since 2003, the ISO 128 family has expanded to fifteen parts, which initiated between 1996 and 2003. The standard begins with a summary of general rules for the execution and structure of technical drawings. It then describes basic conventions for lines, views, cuts and sections, and different types of engineering drawings—including mechanical, architectural, civil, and shipbuilding. ISO 128 applies to both manual and computer-based drawings, but not to three-dimensional CAD models.

The ISO 128 series replaced the earlier DIN 6 standard for drawings, projections, and views, first published in 1922 and updated in 1950 and 1968. ISO 128 itself debuted in 1982 as a 15‑page document specifying general presentation principles for orthographic projection methods.

Several parts of ISO 128 have been updated individually, and new parts were added (e.g., Part 15 in 2013). The most recent revisions were published in 2020 and 2022.

== Composition ==
=== Current parts ===
- ISO 128-1:2020 Technical product documentation (TPD) — General principles of representation — Part 1: Introduction and fundamental requirements
- ISO 128-2:2020 Technical product documentation (TPD) — General principles of representation — Part 2: Basic conventions for lines
- ISO 128-3:2022 Technical product documentation (TPD) — General principles of representation — Part 3: Views, sections and cuts
- ISO 128-15:2013 Technical product documentation (TPD) — General principles of presentation — Part 15: Presentation of shipbuilding drawings
- ISO/TS 128-71:2010 Technical product documentation (TPD) — Simplified representation for mechanical engineering drawings
- ISO 128-100:2020 Technical product documentation — General principles of representation — Part 100: Index

=== Withdrawn parts ===
Replaced by ISO 128-2
2020

- ISO 128-20:1999 — Basic conventions for lines
- ISO 128-21:1997 — Preparation of lines by CAD systems
- ISO 128-22:1999 — Conventions for leader lines and reference lines
- ISO 128-23:1999 — Lines on construction drawings
- ISO 128-24:2014 — Lines on mechanical engineering drawings
- ISO 128-25:1999 — Lines on shipbuilding drawings

Replaced by ISO 128-3
2022

- ISO 128-30:2001 — Basic conventions for views
- ISO 128-33:2018 — Representation of views, sections and cuts in construction drawings
- ISO 128-34:2001 — Views on mechanical engineering drawings
- ISO 128-40:2001 — Conventions for cuts and sections
- ISO 128-43:2015 — Projection methods in building drawings
- ISO 128-44:2001 — Sections on mechanical engineering drawings
- ISO 128-50:2001 — Conventions for representing areas on cuts and sections

== Related ISO standards ==
A size chart illustrating the ISO A series described in ISO 216

- ISO 129 Technical product documentation (TPD) — Presentation of dimensions and tolerances
  - ISO 129-1:2018 — General principles
  - ISO 129-4:2013 — Dimensioning of shipbuilding drawings
  - ISO 129-5:2018 — Dimensioning of structural metal work
- ISO 216 — Paper sizes (e.g., A4)
- ISO 406:1987 — Tolerancing of linear and angular dimensions
- ISO 1660:2017 — Geometrical tolerancing
- ISO 2203:1973 — Conventional representation of gears
- ISO 3098-1:1974 — Lettering — Part 1: Currently used characters
- ISO 5455:1979 — Scales
- ISO 5456 Technical drawings — Projection methods
- ISO 5457:1999 — Sizes and layout of drawing sheets
- ISO 7519:1991 — Principles of presentation for assembly drawings
- ISO 8015:2011 — Fundamentals of geometrical product specifications
