= Scale ruler =

Tool used for measuring at a fixed ratio

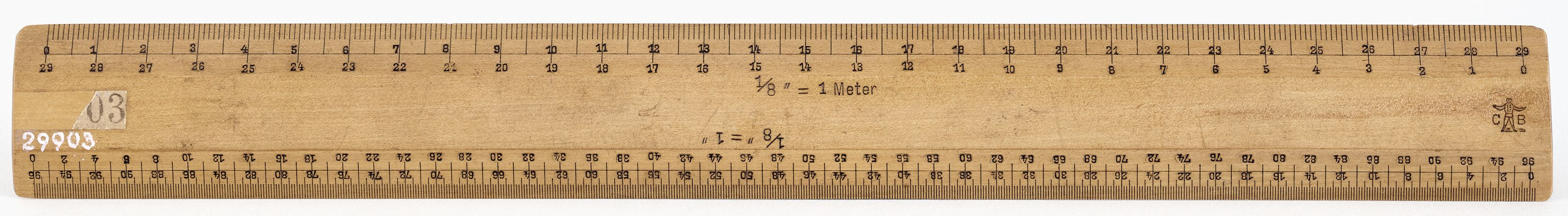
A flat scale ruler

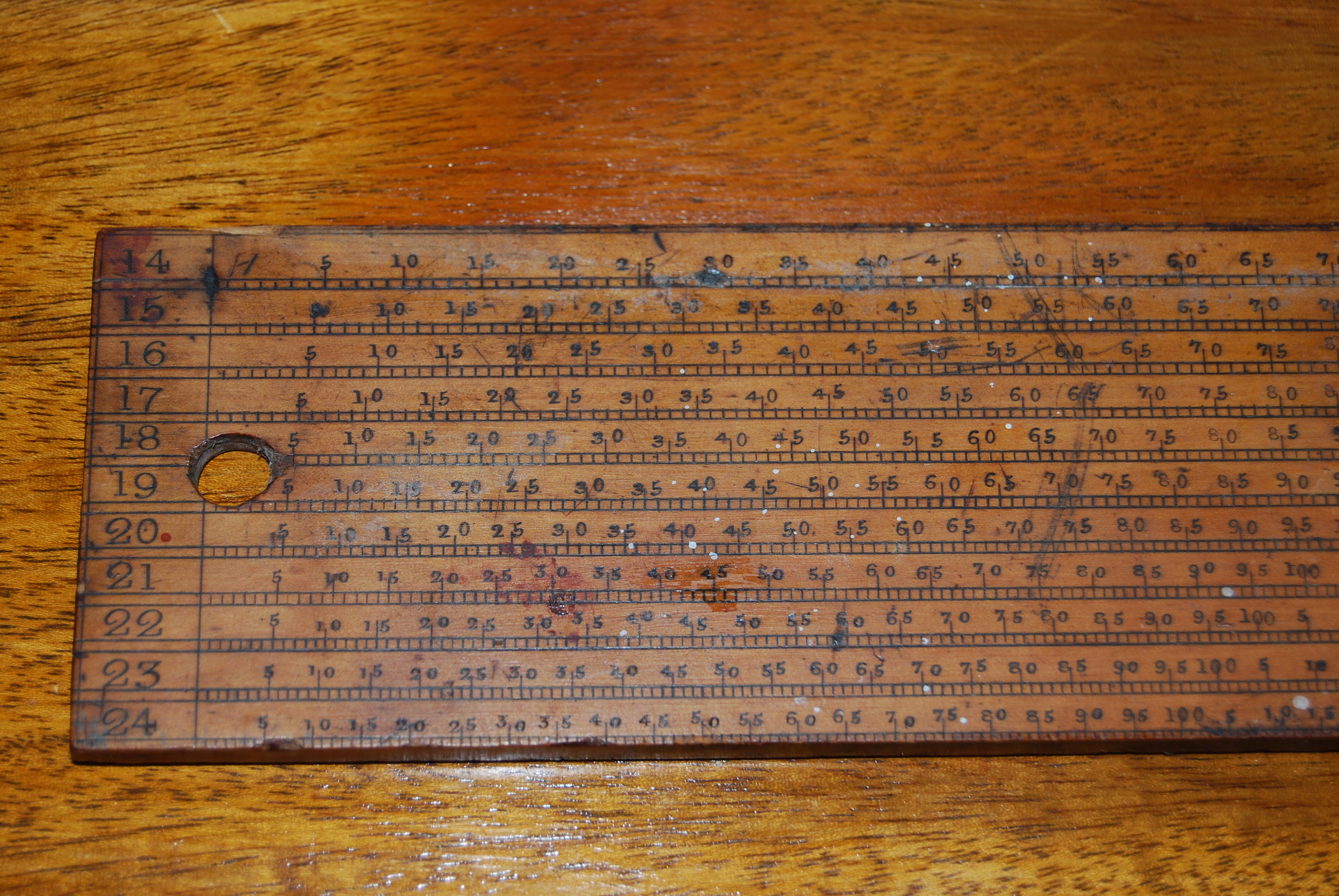
A flat scale ruler with multiple scales

A scale ruler is a tool for measuring lengths and transferring measurements at a fixed ratio of length; two common examples are an architect's scale and engineer's scale. In scientific and engineering terminology, a device to measure linear distance and create proportional linear measurements is called a scale. A device for drawing straight lines is a straight edge or ruler. In common usage, both are referred to as a ruler.

== Architect's scale ==
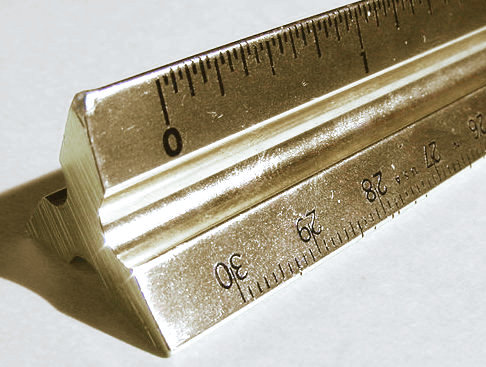
A triangular architect's scale, made of brass

An architect's scale is a specialized ruler designed to facilitate the drafting and measuring of architectural drawings, such as floor plans and Multi-view orthographic projections.

Because the scale of such drawings is often smaller than life-size, an architect's scale features multiple units of length and proportional length increments.

For accuracy and longevity, the material used should be dimensionally stable and durable. Scales were traditionally made of wood, but today they are usually made of rigid plastic or aluminum.

=== United States and Imperial units ===
In the United States, and prior to metrication in Britain, Canada and Australasia, architect's scales are marked as a ratio of x inches-to-the-foot (typically written as x″=1′-0″). For example, one inch measured from a drawing with a scale of "one-inch-to-the-foot" is equivalent to one foot in the real world (a scale of 1:12)....one inch measured from a drawing with a scale of "two-inches-to-the-foot" is equivalent to six inches in the real world (a scale of 1:6). It is not to be confused with a true unitless ratio. A 1:5 architectural scale (inches to feet) would be a 1:60 unitless scale (inches to inches) since there are 60 inches in 5 feet.

Typical scales used in the United States are:

full scale, with inches, divided into sixteenths of an inch

The following scales are generally grouped in pairs using the same dual-numbered index line (one scale is read from the right, and the other scale is read from the left):

three-inches-to-the-foot (3″=1′-0″) (ratio equivalent 1:4)	one-and-one-half-inch-to-the-foot (1 1/2″=1′-0″) (1:8)
one-inch-to-the-foot (1″=1′-0″) (1:12)	one-half-inch-to-the-foot (1/2″=1′-0″) (1:24)
three-quarters-inch-to-the-foot (3/4″=1′-0″) (1:16)	three-eighths-inch-to-the-foot (3/8″=1′-0″) (1:32)
one-quarter-inch-to-the-foot (1/4″=1′-0″) (1:48)	one-eighth-inch-to-the-foot (1/8″=1′-0″) (1:96)
three-sixteenths-inch-to-the-foot (3/16″=1′-0″) (1:64)	three-thirty-seconds-inch-to-the-foot (3/32″=1′0″) (1:128)

=== Metric units ===
Architect's scale rulers used in Britain and other metric countries are marked with ratios without reference to a base unit. Therefore, a drawing will indicate both its scale (ratio) and the unit of measurement being used.

In Britain, and elsewhere, the standard units used on architectural drawings are the (SI) units millimetres (mm) and metres (m), whereas in France centimetres (cm) and metres are most often used.

In Britain, for flat rulers, the paired scales often found on architect's scales are:

- 1:1/1:10
- 1:5/1:50
- 1:10/1:100
- 1:20/1:200
- 1:1250/1:2500

For triangular rulers, the paired scales are:

- 1:1/1:10
- 1:2/1:20
- 1:5/1:50
- 1:100/1:200
- 1:500/1:1000
- 1:1250/1:2500

Less common scales are:

- 1:25/1:250
- 1:33 1/3
- 2:1

In France, in engineering departments or architectural offices, here are some scales used :

- 1:100 / 1:300
- 1:200 / 1:400
- 1:250 / 1:500

== Engineer's scale ==
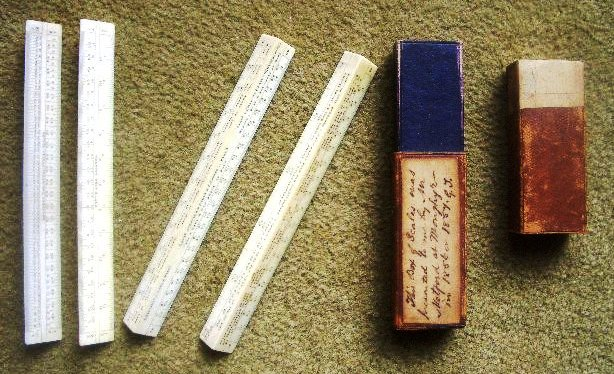
Boxed set of 1850s ivory engineer's scales presented to the railway civil engineer George Turnbull in India. 16 scales are engraved.

An engineer's scale is a tool for measuring distances and transferring measurements at a fixed ratio of length. It is commonly made of plastic or aluminum and is just over 300 millimetres (12 in) long, but with the only 300 mm of markings, leaving the ends unmarked so that the first and last measuring ticks do not wear off. It is used in making engineering drawings, commonly called blueprints, blue lines, or plans on a specific scale. For example, "one-tenth size" would appear on a drawing to indicate a part larger than the drawing on the paper itself. It is not to be used to measure machined parts to see if they meet specifications.

In the United States this scale is divided into decimalized fractions of an inch but has a cross-section like an equilateral triangle, which enables the scale to have six edges indexed for measurement. One edge is divided into tenths of an inch, and the subsequent ones are directly marked for twentieths, thirtieths, fortieths, fiftieths, and finally sixtieths of an inch. Referred to as 1:10, 1:20, 1:30,1:40, 1:50 or 1:60 scale. Typically in civil engineering applications, 1:10 (1″=10′) is used exclusively for detail drawings. 1:20 and 1:40 scales are used for working plans. 1:60 is normally used only to show large areas of a project.

In 1918 French described the US engineer's scale using the term "civil engineers' scale", and it was said to be "used for plotting and map drawing, and the graphic solution of problems."

== See also ==
- Technical drawing tools
