= Cameo lighting =

Type of spotlight

In film, cameo lighting is any lighting which has the talent in light, accentuating them and maybe a few props in a scene. It is often done using spotlights with barn doors. Cameo lighting derives its name from the art form in which a light relief figure is set against a darker background. It helps focus on the subject and not its environment. Cameo lighting can be used with a fill light, which reduces its starkness.

It is the opposite of a silhouette, another type of chiaroscuro lighting.

A problem with cameo lighting is that it can lead to color distortion and noise in the darkest areas.
