= Color scroller =

Color-changing accessory for stage lighting fixtures

A colour scroller or colour changer is an electro-mechanical lighting accessory used in theater, film, dance and concerts to change the colour projected by stage lighting instruments without the need of a person to be in the vicinity of the light. A colour scroller moves plastic "gel" colour gel [actually dyed polyester and/or other base materials coated with dyes] into the beam of the light. It is generally attached to the gel frame holder at the transmitting end of a lighting fixture, so colour is introduced after the beam characteristics have been defined by the optics of the lighting instrument. Most scrollers are controlled via DMX512 protocol, but some models (e.g. Wybron's Colouram IT) also utilize the RDM protocol. When colour scrollers were first introduced around 1980, a number of companies produced them, including: Avolites, GAM Products, Morpheus Lights, Rainbow, Rosco Laboratories and Wybron Inc. Now the main manufacturers are: A.C. Lighting, Apollo, Morpheus Lights and Rainbow (in alphabetical order).

== Types of scrollers ==
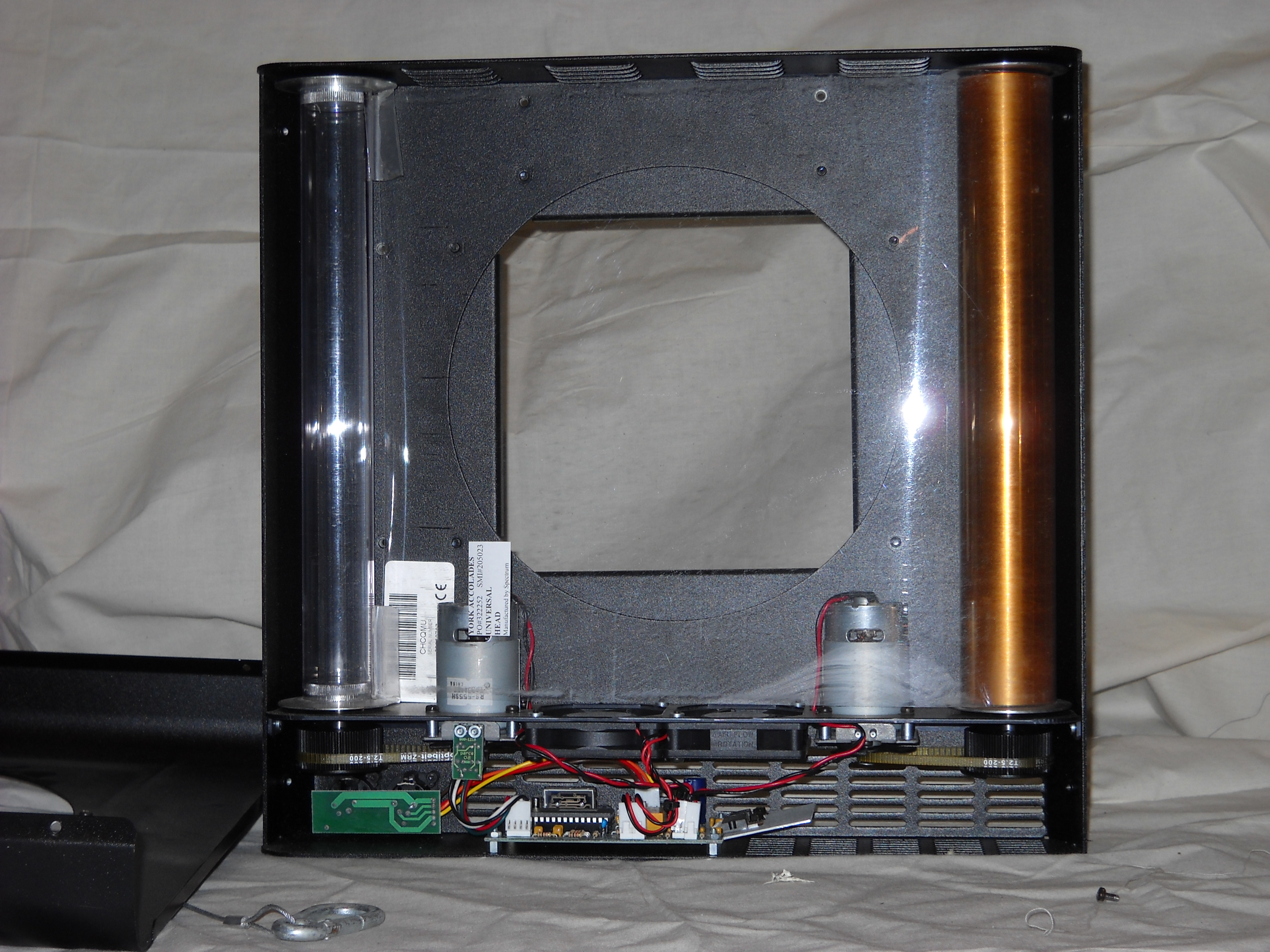
Interior view of a Chroma Q 6" single string scroller, with scroll.

=== Single string scrollers ===
The most commonly used type of scroller is the single string scroller. This type has only one string of colour anywhere from 2 to 33 frames long.

=== Dual string scrollers ===
Dual string scrollers use 2 strings (one behind the other) and allow for a form of CMY mixing. The Apollo MXR 2, Chroma-Q Cascade and the Wybron CXI use 2 gel strings to obtain a CMY mix. One frame of clear gel is positioned at the center of each gel string (50% DMX) with progressively denser frames of colour positioned to either side of it. The first string has progressively denser yellow and cyan frames and the second string has progressively denser yellow and magenta frames. This permits various YC, YM, and CM combinations to be achieved as a "static" colour mix. There is a limited ability to transition "live" between mixed colours - although some transitions cannot be accomplished without passing through the clear center frame.

=== CYM colour-mixing scrollers ===
Finally, there are "true" CYM mixing scrollers that utilize three independently controlled gel strings - namely, the "ColorFader" system manufactured by Morpheus Lights of Las Vegas, NV, USA. Independent control of the gel strings permits users to cross-fade "from any color, to any color, anytime" directly (without going through undesired colours as on a single or double string colour changer).

The ColorFader system predated the dichroic systems used in most moving lights, to create smooth colour transitions. The basic concept of both systems is identical. Colour density variation is achieved by starting with a full-density sheet of gel (or dichroic glass) in either Cyan, Magenta or Yellow. The saturation of that colour is varied by perforating the gel sheet (or ablation of the dichroic) in a manner that permits unfiltered white light to pass through in varying amounts, progressing from full white to the fully saturated colour.

At the zero DMX "start" position on a ColorFader scroll there is a piece of clear gel (which is perforated with large holes to maximize light transmission). As the DMX control value is increased the gel string moves to the coloured gel, which has perforated holes are that are large and plentiful - so the percentage of white light passing through those hole predominates over that of the gel colour, and low-saturation colours are achieved. As DMX control value increases, it progresses the scroll further and the holes become smaller and less numerous - so the percentage of coloured material in the optical path increases relative to the white light pass-through, and the result is progressively higher density colour transmission. Ultimately, at full DMX, a solid, unperforated sheet of gel is positioned in the optical path - for full saturation.

== Sizes ==
colour scrollers come in many different sizes and are mountable on nearly every type of conventional lighting instrument. Sizes include:

- 4 Inch (for smaller PAR 36 units)
- 6 to 7.5 Inch (fits ETC Source 4 19°, 26°, 36° and 50° units)
- 8 to 10 inch (fits PAR 56 & 64 units)
- 12 inch (fits large sized Fresnel units like 2 KW tungsten units)
- 15 inch (fits bigger Fresnels, like 5KW tungsten or 2.4 KW HMI units)
- 20-30 inch (fits Thomas 8 Light and Thomas 9 Light units)
- Large format scrollers for ETC Multi-PAR units

== Control ==
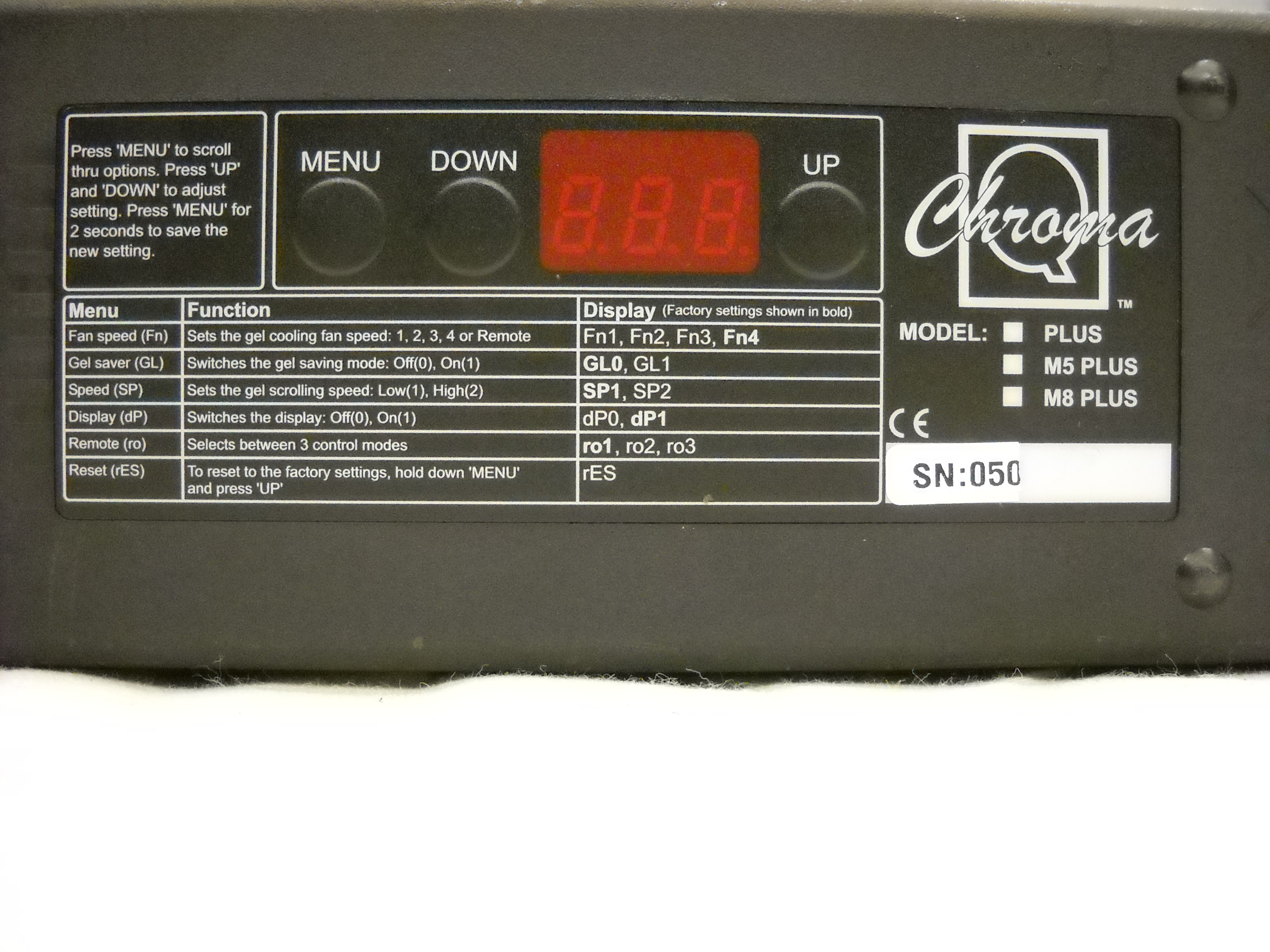
Input interface on a Chroma Q 6" scroller.

Most colour scrollers use DMX512 addressing protocol. Each scroller unit is given an address or identifying number. Earlier scroller models used binary DIP switches to set the address, however most scrollers currently include digital addressing systems. Once addressed, the unit is then connected with other colour scrollers and run back to a power supply (typically with 4-pin XLR cable. 4-pin is used to differentiate power lines from data.) The power supply receives the DMX control signal from the Lighting control console and distributes control signal (either DMX or a proprietary manufacturers signal) to each colour scroller unit along with 24 volts DC. Depending on the manufacturer, power supplies can power anywhere from 1 to 64 units.

Some colour scrollers are configured for "daisy chain" connection, by which 4-pin power/control cable feeds into and then out of a number of scrollers. The number of units that can be daisy chained together is limited by a head-feet restriction. Head-feet is defined as the total sum of the lengths of cable from each device to a single power supply. It is a way to account for the voltage drop in the power/signal cable caused the current drawn from each unit and the length of the cable. If you exceed the recommended "head feet" you may experience performance problems with all of the scrollers on the chain.

Other scroller systems, such as the Morpheus ColorFader, do not permit daisy chaining. Up to six standard ColorFader units (SFader or MFader) can be powered from a ColorFader PS-6 power supply - which is a simple unit that is generally hung on a pipe near the active ColorFader units. Because independent "Home runs" (uninterrupted connection) of 4-pin cable reliably carry power and control signal directly to each ColorFader unit, the need to keep track of "head feet" is eliminated.

Some new models of scrollers are moving towards the RDM protocol and are using small LED screens for addressing and other settings on the unit. This new method of control allows for easier addressing and the ability to "talk-back" to each scroller (to get, for example, diagnostic information). Morpheus colourFader3 units, among others, have direct push-button addressing for DMX with an LED display that provides complete set-up status information for each unit.

colour scrollers utilize from 1 to 4 channels depending on their capabilities. One channel is required for every string of gel (up to 3) and one channel is required for optional control settings. Optional settings include: Remote fan control (ability to control the fan's speed and on/off status), preset colour string mixed colour positions (for scrollers with multiple strings), preset effects/times, and control over the speed the string moves.

With the newer RDM protocol many more options can now be made available. These can include: Light sensor (to see if the fixture the scroller is attached to is on), temperature sensor, voltage sensor, timers, fan control, self test, gel string sensor (gives info on colour, use, and if the string is broken). Although RDM provides significantly more options, few manufacturers have yet implemented these features into existing products.

== Colour strings ==
Most companies offer two standard types of gel strings generally referred to as "theater" and for "rock and roll". Typically, the theatre scroll will contain subtler colours, while the rock and roll scroll will contain more saturated shades. A number of scroller manufacturers and third party vendors offer scrolls made with custom colours, assembled to a customer's specifications, though these are non-standard items and carry a premium. A custom adhesive, known as high-temperature scroll tape, is also available to allow technicians to repair sections of scrolls that have become damaged. This scroll tape also allows for the fabrication of unique custom scrolls, although the cost in materials generally precludes the mass production of "home made" scrolls.

=== Example ===
Below is an example, from Wybron Inc utilizing GAM colours , of a typical scroll set. Note that the first position on the scroll is actually a clear piece intended to affix the scroll to the scroller.

Wybron Theatre 16 Frame String
Position	Code	Description
1.		Clear Leader
2.	G480	Medium Yellow
3.	G385	Light Amber
4.	G340	Light Bastard Amber
5.	G335	Coral
6.	G345	Deep Amber
7.	G270	Red Orange
8.	G195	Nymph Pink
9.	G120	Bright Pink
10.	G970	Special Lavender
11.	G948	African Violet
12.	G720	Light Steel Blue
13.	G810	Moon Blue
14.	G850	Blue (Primary)
15.	G540	Pale Green
16.	G690	Bluegrass

Wybron Rock-n-Roll 16 Frame String
Position	Code	Description
1.		Clear Leader
2.	G450	Saffron
3.	G345	Deep Amber
4.	G355	Amber Flame
5.	G245	Light Red
6.	G250	Medium Red XT
7.	G120	Bright Pink
8.	G995	Orchid
9.	G948	African Violet
10.	G930	Real Congo Blue
11.	G810	Moon Blue
12.	G835	Aztec Blue
13.	G850	Blue (Primary)
14.	G710	Blue Green
15.	G690	Bluegrass
16.	G655	Rich Green

== Dichroic colour changers ==
Introduced as an alternative to a colour scroller, High End System's colourmerge unit was an add-on dichroic colour changer. It was a colour mixing unit made to be used with the ETC Source Four ellipsoidal fixture. Unlike a traditional colour scroller, it was installed inside the unit between the reflector assembly and shutters. It provided CMY colour mixing via dichroic glass plates. "colourmerge" was a relatively expensive device which lacked reliability - these problem ultimately caused it to fail in the marketplace. It was discontinued in 2004.

More recently, the SeaChanger line by Ocean Thin Films accomplishes much the same thing but features a wide range of patented dichroic colour wheels in an array of saturation levels, for added colour possibilities. The SeaChanger unit is also much larger than the colourmerge and completely replaces the shutter assembly of a Source Four fixture. The SeaChanger has achieved a much higher level of commercial success.

In 2009, Morpheus Lights introduced the PacificFader line of dichroic colour changers, which were specifically developed for use with the modular Selecon Pacific ellipsoidal fixtures manufactured by Philips Entertainment. PacificFader units were available with either 3, 4, or 5 control parameters: PacificFader3 provided C,Y,M colour mixing for use with tungsten fixtures. PacificFader4 added a smooth optical dimmer/douser to the C,Y,M control, for use with energy efficient arc sources (CDM, MSR, MSD). The top-of-the-line PacificFader5 adds Morpheus' extended range CTO filter, which could either be used to colour-correct daylight sources to match tungsten units or to "bend" the CYM colour mix for additional subtle colour control.
