= Stage lighting instrument =

Device that emits light to illuminate performers

A Source Four ERS with major parts labeled

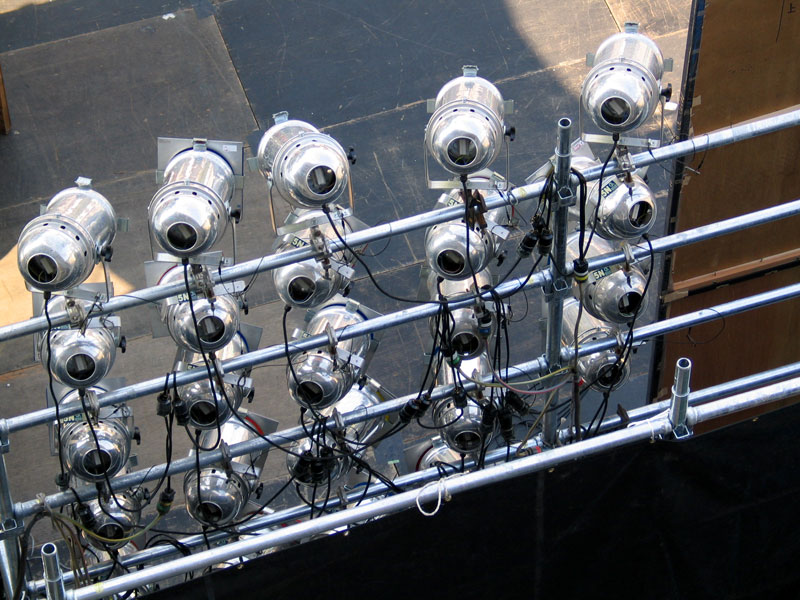
20 PAR can lighting instruments

Stage lighting instruments (lanterns, or luminaires in Europe) are used in stage lighting to illuminate theatrical productions, concerts, and other performances taking place in live performance venues. They are also used to light television studios and sound stages.

Many stagecraft terms vary between the United States and the United Kingdom. In the United States, lighting fixtures are often called "instruments" or "units". In the UK, they are called "lanterns" or "luminaires". This article mainly uses terms common to the United States.

== Components ==
See the picture at the top of the page for the physical location of most components.

Stage lighting instruments all have the following components:

=== Housing ===
The lamp housing is a metal or plastic container that serves as a body for the entire instrument and prevents light from spilling in unwanted directions. It comprises all of the exterior of the fixture except for the lens or opening. The housing may be designed with specific elements that help reduce heat and increase the efficiency of a lamp. Older instruments were made from rolled and machined steel or aluminum. With the advent of the Source Four, many lighting instruments are being made from die cast metal. Die casting allows for one single, light-weight body that is more economical to produce and use. The first lantern to make use of die castings was the Strand Pattern 23 designed by Fred Bentham in 1953, this small mirror spot enjoyed a 30-year production run and found its way into many British schools, halls and theaters. Some instruments are made from plastic, such as the Selecon Pacific.

=== Lens or opening ===
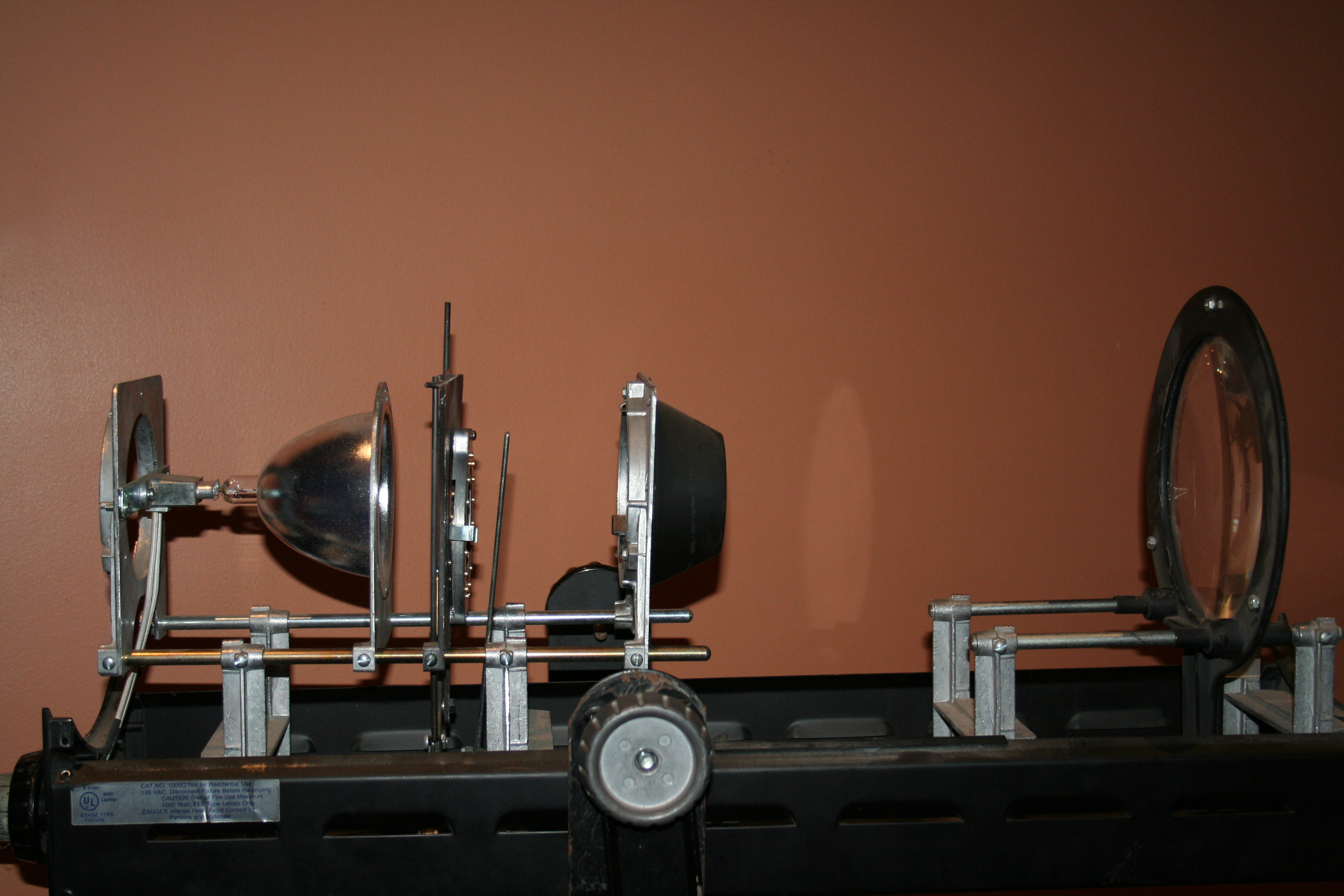
Optics of an Altman 1000Q followspot. From left to right: Lamp, Ellipsoidal Reflector, Shutter/Iris Assembly, Fixed Lens, Variable Lens.

The opening is the gap in the housing from where the beam of light is intended to come. Many fixtures use a lens to help control the beam of light, though some, such as border or cyclorama lights, do not have any lenses or optics other than the reflector. The lens and the reflector, along with other beam-altering devices, are both considered part of the optics system.

There are two main lens types. Profile Lens Systems and Wash Lens Systems. Instruments with profile lens systems usually have a beam that is narrow and hard edged. ERS lights and follow spots use these lenses. On the other hand, fixtures such as PAR's and Fresnels use wash lens systems. The wash lens system casts a diffused wash of light with a softer beam edge.

=== Reflector ===
The reflector affects the quality and directionality of the light output. A reflector is located behind or around the light source in such a way as to direct more light towards the lens or opening. Each unit has a characteristic reflector, used in conjunction with the lens (or lack thereof) to create the desired effect. An ellipsoidal reflector has a lamp set at one focus point of an ellipsoid-shaped reflector that bounces the light and focuses it at the second focus point of the ellipse. This focuses the beam of light into a tight beam. Ellipsoidal reflectors often are used for tight, focusable spots, although they can be used for floodlights, such as in scoops (see below). A parabolic reflector has a lamp set at the focus point of a parabola-shaped reflector that bounces the light in parallel beams away from the reflector. There is no point at which the light converges, so the light is unfocusable. Parabolic reflectors are used for lights intended to provide an unfocused wash, such as PAR cans.

Reflectors can also be used to selectively reduce or eliminate unwanted thermal emission. Incandescent lamps produce light through heating of the filament, while arc lamps produce light through the heating and ionization of a gas. In either case, this heat is also emitted from the lamp as infrared light. The thermal energy is often projected onto the stage with the visible light, and thousands of watts of incandescent lighting can be uncomfortably hot for the actors on stage. Specially designed reflectors are able to absorb and dissipate infrared at the fixture before the visible light reaches the stage.

=== Yoke ===
Most instruments are suspended or supported by a U-shaped yoke, fixed at two points to the sides of the instrument, providing an axis of rotation. The base of the yoke is typically a single bolt around which the yoke can be rotated, providing a second axis of rotation. Combined, these two axes allow the fixture to point nearly anywhere in a spherical range of motion encircling the yoke.

The yoke is connected to a pipe or batten by one of the clamps mentioned below. It may also be affixed to the deck with floor mounts, or attached to the set with a stage screw.

Some yokes are motorized, allowing remote control systems to change where a fixture is pointing during a show.

=== Attachment apparatus ===
C-Clamps are hook clamps that use a threaded bolt to attach to a pipe or batten and to hold the instrument secure. Once secured, the fixture can be panned and tilted using adjustment knobs on the yoke and clamp. In addition, safety cables (a loop of aircraft cable terminated with carabiners) are used to support the lighting instrument in case the clamp fails. A side arm is a metal pole bolted to the instrument with a clamp on the end. This enables the instrument to be hung to the side of an electric as opposed to below it.

=== Lamp or arc source ===
All instruments need some type of source to produce light. The bulbs used are referred to as lamps. Stage lighting instruments typically use incandescent lamps, tungsten-halogen lamps, encapsulated arcs, or LEDs. Most theatrical lamps are tungsten-halogen (or quartz-halogen), an improvement on the original incandescent design that used halogen gas instead of an inert gas. Fluorescent lights are rarely used other than as work lights (see below). Although they are far more efficient, they cannot be dimmed (run at less than full power) without using specialized dimmers, cannot dim to very low levels, do not produce light from a single point or easily concentrated area, and have a warm-up period during which they emit no light or do so intermittently. High-intensity discharge lamps (or HID lamps) are now common where a very bright light output is required, for example in large follow spots, HMI (hydrargyrum medium-arc iodide) floods, and modern automated fixtures. Because these types of lamps cannot be electrically dimmed, dimming is done by mechanical dousers or shutters that physically block portions of the lamp to decrease output. Some specially designed fittings now use light-emitting diodes (LEDs) as a light source. LEDs are ideal where an intense but unfocused light source is required, such as for lighting a cyclorama. LEDs have now been added to fixtures such as the Source Four LED, which looks similar to the source four onstage, but is controlled with LEDs.

Incandescent lamps are most likely the type of light one is used to seeing. They are typical household lights that are usually between 40 and 100 watts. However, the US has been taking them out of production due to their inefficient nature. Typically, an incandescent lamp has a tungsten filament surrounded by an inert gas. This is all encapsulated by a bulb. The inert gas stops the formation of anything that could darken the bulb, such as carbon. The bulb is usually made from Pyrex or synthetic quartz. Incandescent lamps also have a base. The base screws into a socket and serves as an electrical contact point for the socket and the filament inside. For the most part, higher watt bulbs will use larger bases. Incandescent bulbs for stage lighting may have pins on the bottom instead of a screw. This allows them to be positioned properly in relation to a reflector. The filament of the lamp is usually tightly coiled tungsten wire.

Tungsten-Halogen lamps, or T-H lamps, are similar to incandescent bulbs, but instead of an inert gas being used, a halogen gas is used. Halogens are chemically active. Therefore, when the filament releases tungsten particles, the halogen gas forms a compound with them that the filament attracts back. The particles of tungsten then attach to the filament again. Because of this, there are less tungsten deposits on the bulb and the filament is constantly rebuilt, and so the light lasts much longer than a typical incandescent light.

LEDs are of an advantage because they are available in many colors today. LEDs are semiconducting diodes that emit light. The chemical composition of the LED determines the color of the light. Unlike conventional fixtures, LEDs do not need dimmers, but have intensities controlled by wattage. LED lights are much more energy efficient than incandescent or T-H lamps. While a household incandescent may be rated for 100 watts, an LED of the same intensity could be under 15 watts. One of their advantages to T-H and incandescent bulbs is that they do not require colored gels. LED fixtures typically come with multiple colors of LED lights. Color theory shows that mixing the primary colors of light will make white light. Therefore, through color mixing, LED's can form a wide variety of colors from white light to deep primary colors to many others. This reduces the time taken to change the color of an already hung fixture. The introduction of the LED allows much more variety of color and they also require much less power, making them useful to have in a theater or production.

Arc sources produce an electric arc. Electric current moving in the gap between the two electrodes creates a bright blue light. They are typically found in follow spots and moving fixtures. One of their downsides is that they cannot be dimmed: the light can be on or off. However, mechanical dimmers such as dousers, with slats or an iris to limit the light leaving the fixture, can be used to control the amount of light leaving the fixture.

=== Accessories ===
Conventional (non-intelligent) fixtures are designed to accept a number of different accessories intended to assist in the modification of the output. The most common, found on almost all stage lights, is the gel frame holder. The gel frame holder is intended to hold gel, mounted in cardboard or metal gel frames. Other common accessories include gobo holders or rotators, iris holders, donuts, barn doors and color scrollers. Gobos are templates made from a thin piece of metal that have designs to project patterns. An Iris is an accessory which can alter the size of the projected beam of light. Color scrollers hold a spool of color media that have been attached to each other. It can then scroll through the gels to change the color.

== Transaction ==
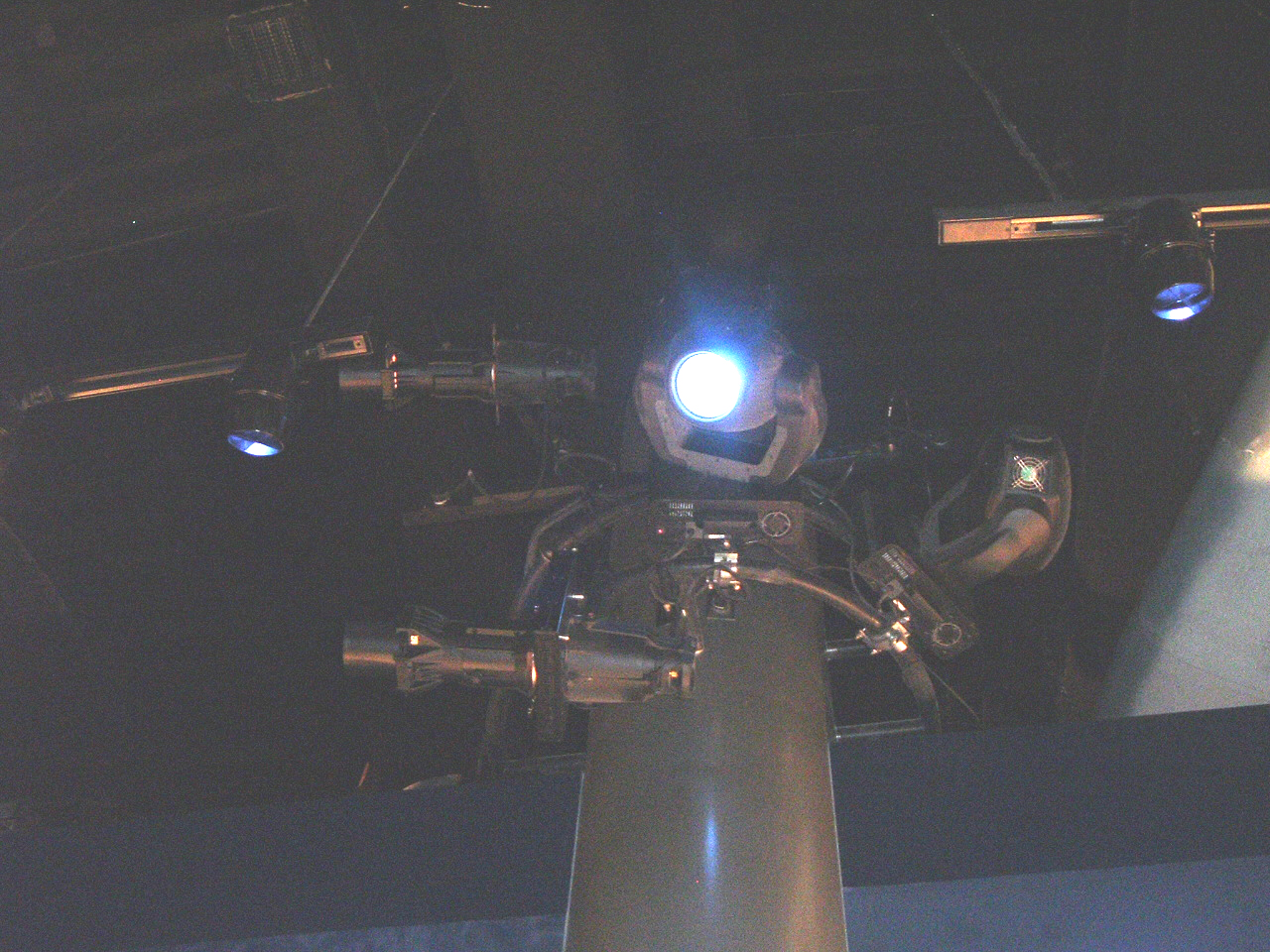
Floodlights (the intelligent moving head lights) and spotlights (the Source Fours) in use at the USMC museum.

Lighting instruments can be broadly separated into two categories: floodlights, which illuminate a wide area, and spotlights (sometimes known as profiles), which produce a narrower, more controllable light beam. The distinction has to do with the characteristics of the light produced by the instrument. Spotlights produce a potentially tightly focused light, while floodlights produce a much more diffuse light. Instruments that fall somewhere in the middle of the spectrum can be classified as either a spot or a flood, depending on the type of instrument and how it is used.

=== Stagelights ===
==== PAR lights ====
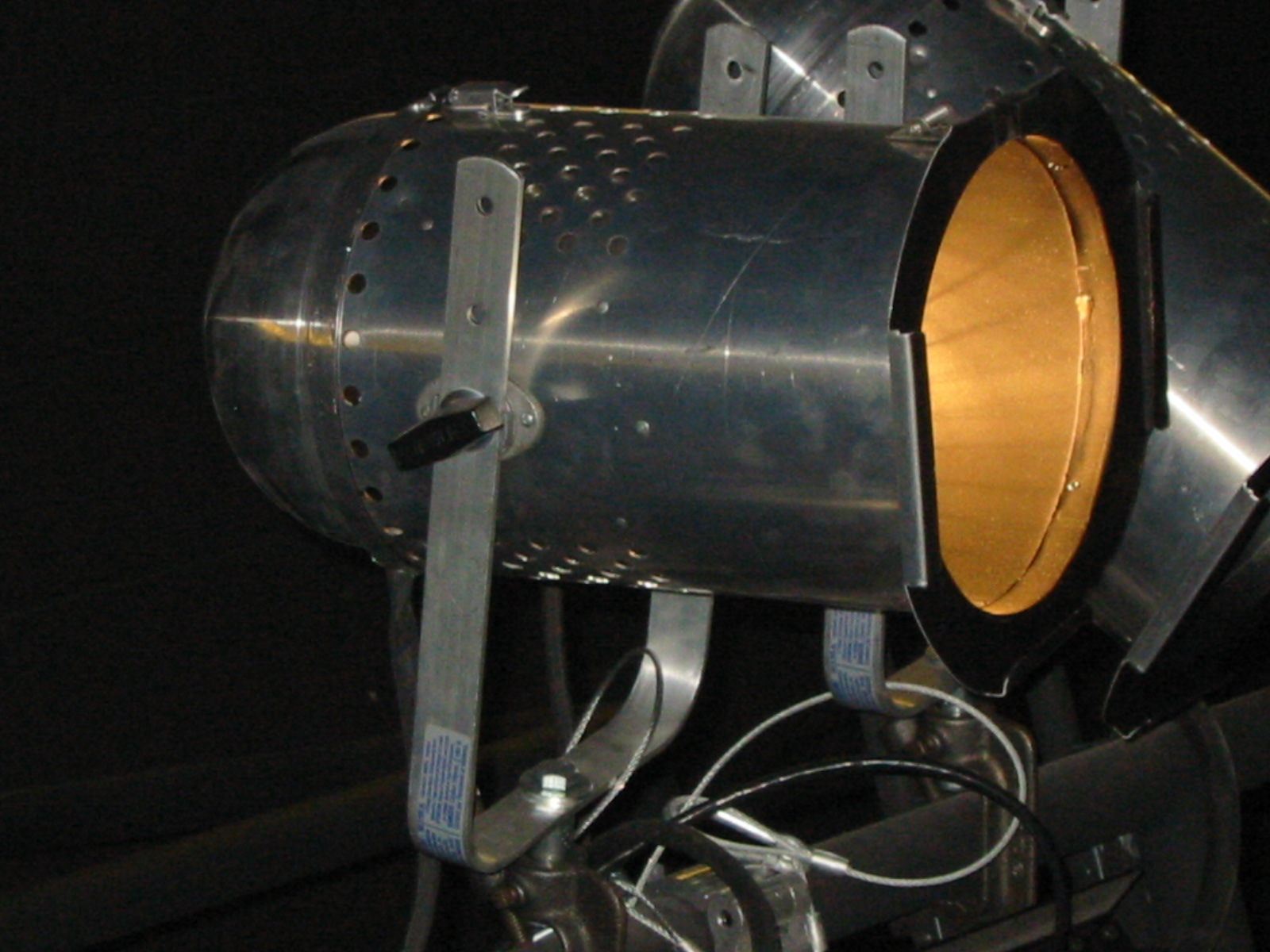
PAR 64.

Parabolic Aluminized Reflector lights, or PAR lights, or PAR cans, are used when a substantial amount of flat lighting is required for a scene. A PAR can is a sealed beam PAR lamp housed in a simple can-like unit. Like an old-fashioned automotive headlight, the reflector is integral to the lamp and the beam spread of the unit is not adjustable except by changing the lamp. PAR lamps are widely used in architectural lighting and may often be found at hardware stores. PAR lights have seen heavy use in rock and roll shows, especially those with smaller budgets, due to their low cost, light weight, easy maintenance, high durability, and high output. They are often used in combination with smoke or haze machines which make the path of the beam visible. They are also often used as top, back, or side lights in the theatre and for special effects.

All PAR lamps except those with narrow or very narrow lenses produce an intense oval pool of light, some with fixed focus and soft edges. In order to adjust the orientation of the oval, the lamp must be rotated. The number associated with a PAR light (e.g.: Par 64, Par 36, Par 16) indicates the diameter of the lamp in eighths of an inch.

Four different beam angles can be obtained on the PAR-64. The beam angle is determined by the lamp. Lamps come in "very narrow" (6° x 12°), "narrow" (7° x 14°), "medium" (12° x 28°), and "wide" (24° x 48°). Each angle has two numerical values since the beams are elliptical rather than circular. PAR 16s are often referred to as "birdies".

PAR-bars are aluminum pipes with par cans permanently attached and circuited through the pipe. Par-bars with 4 instruments are often referred to as 4-bars, and par-bars with 6 instruments are referred to as 6-bars.

In 1995 Electronic Theatre Controls (ETC) introduced the Source Four PAR as an alternative to PAR cans . The Source Four PAR is similar to the PAR can, but it has differences as well. Unlike the PAR can, the Source Four PAR does not have a movable parabolic reflector. Also, instead of using a PAR lamp, it uses the same lamps as the Source Four Ellipsoidals. Additionally, the Source Four PAR uses changeable lenses that affect the beam.

==== Strip lights ====
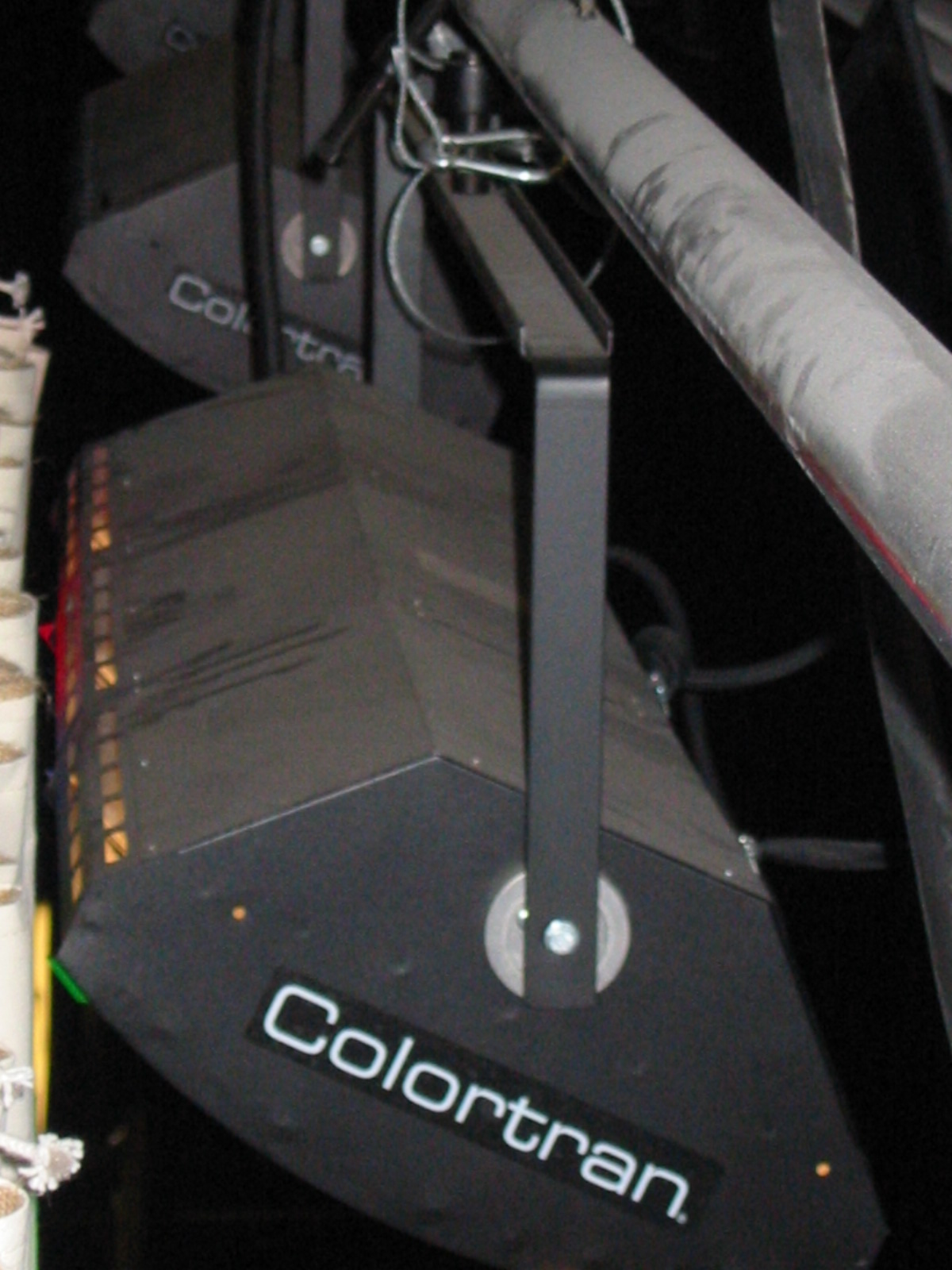
Cyc or strip lights.

Strip lights, also known as cyclorama or cyc lights (thus named because they are effective for lighting the cyclorama, a curtain at the back of the stage), border lights, and codas (by the brand name), are long housings typically containing multiple lamps arranged along the length of the instrument and emitting light perpendicular to its length. Lamps are often covered with gels of multiple colors (often red, green, and blue, which, in theory, allow almost any color to be mixed) with each color controlled by a separate electrical dimmer circuit. Many striplights use round pieces of glass (called roundels) rather than plastic gels for color. Roundels can sustain heavy use for a long time without fading and are often found in more permanent installations.

==== Scoop lights ====
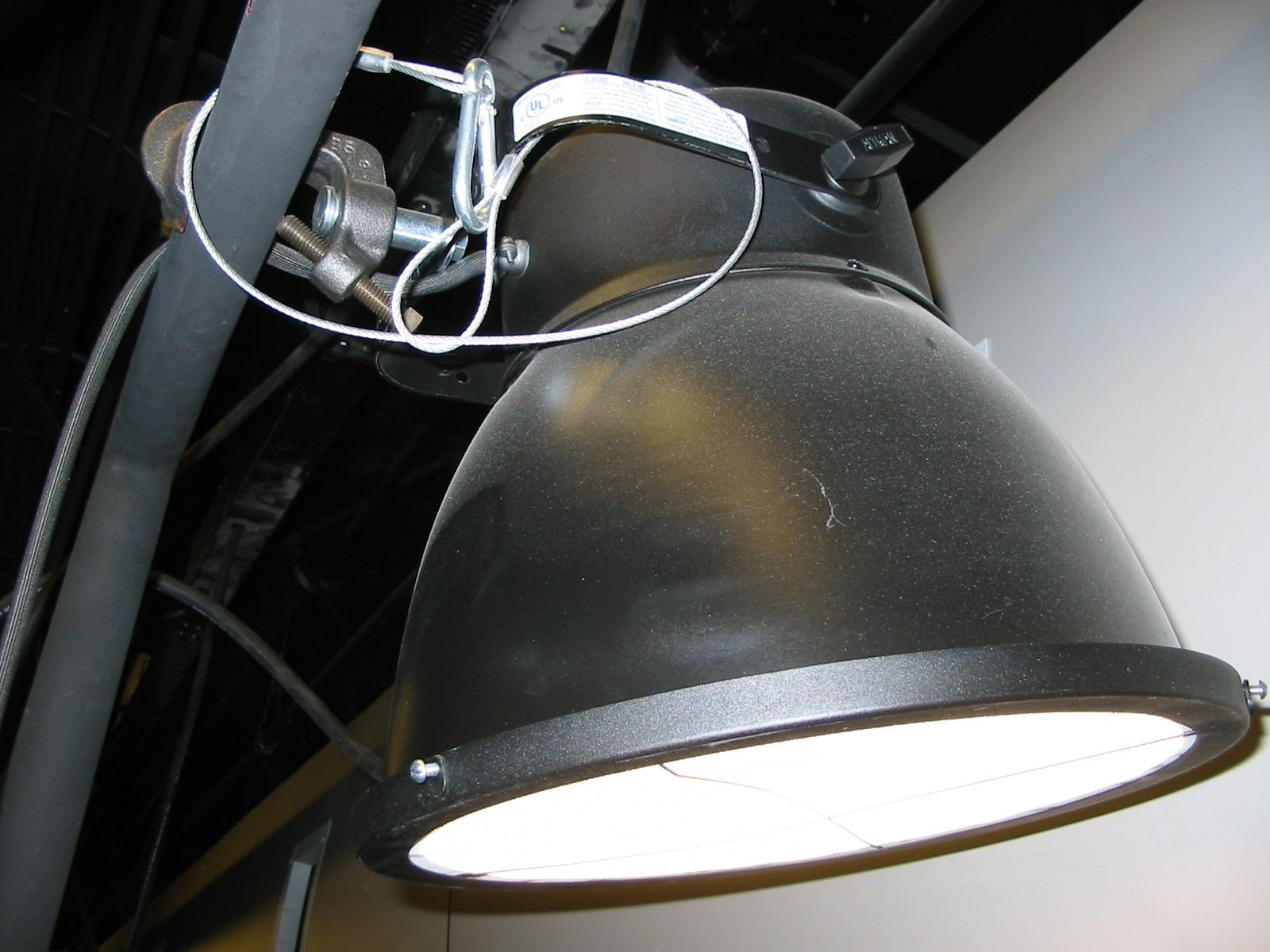
A scoop light.

Scoop lights or scoops are circular fixtures that do not have any lenses. They have an ellipsoidal reflector at the back of the fixture that directs the light out of the fixture. Since they do not have any sort of lens system they are cheaper than other fixtures. However, the light cannot be focused at all (even PARs allow more control than scoops). Scoops are most often used to flood the stage with light from above, or to light backdrops. Scoops can have gels affixed. Occasionally they are used as work lights (see below).

==== House lights and worklights ====
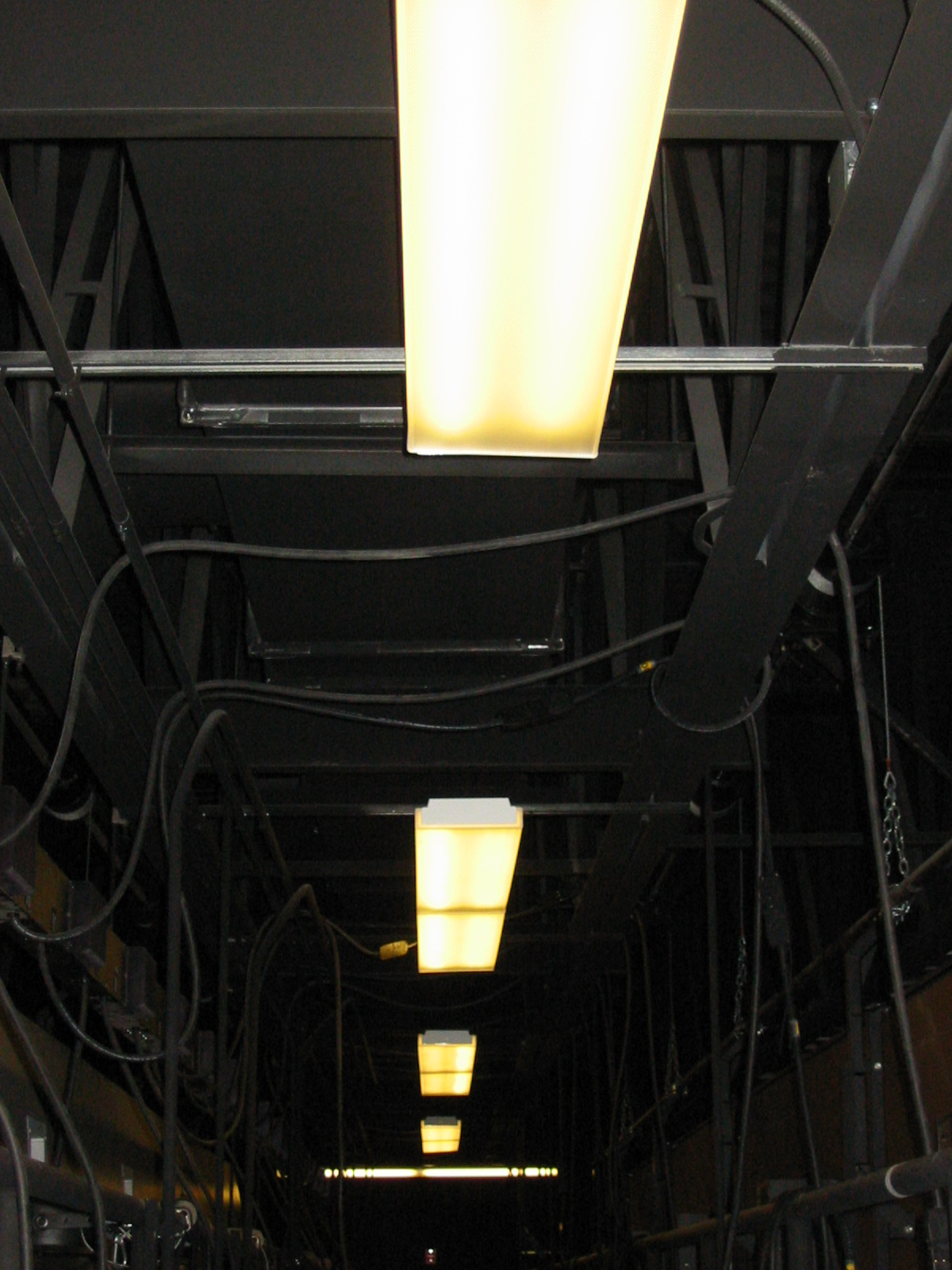
Work lights

House lights provide light on the theater's seats and aisles for the audience before and after performances and during intermissions. They are generally incandescent lights, however fluorescent lights or scoops may be used in some instances. House lights are often controlled by dimmers, but are sometimes on simple switches. Worklights provide general lighting backstage or in the house, and are often fluorescent fixtures. Work lights are almost always non-dimmed.

House and work lights are usually off during performances but are occasionally included in the lighting design to establish focus or emphasize plot elements. When the house lights are not on a dimmer, the switch is usually under the control of the stage manager.

==== LED stage lights ====
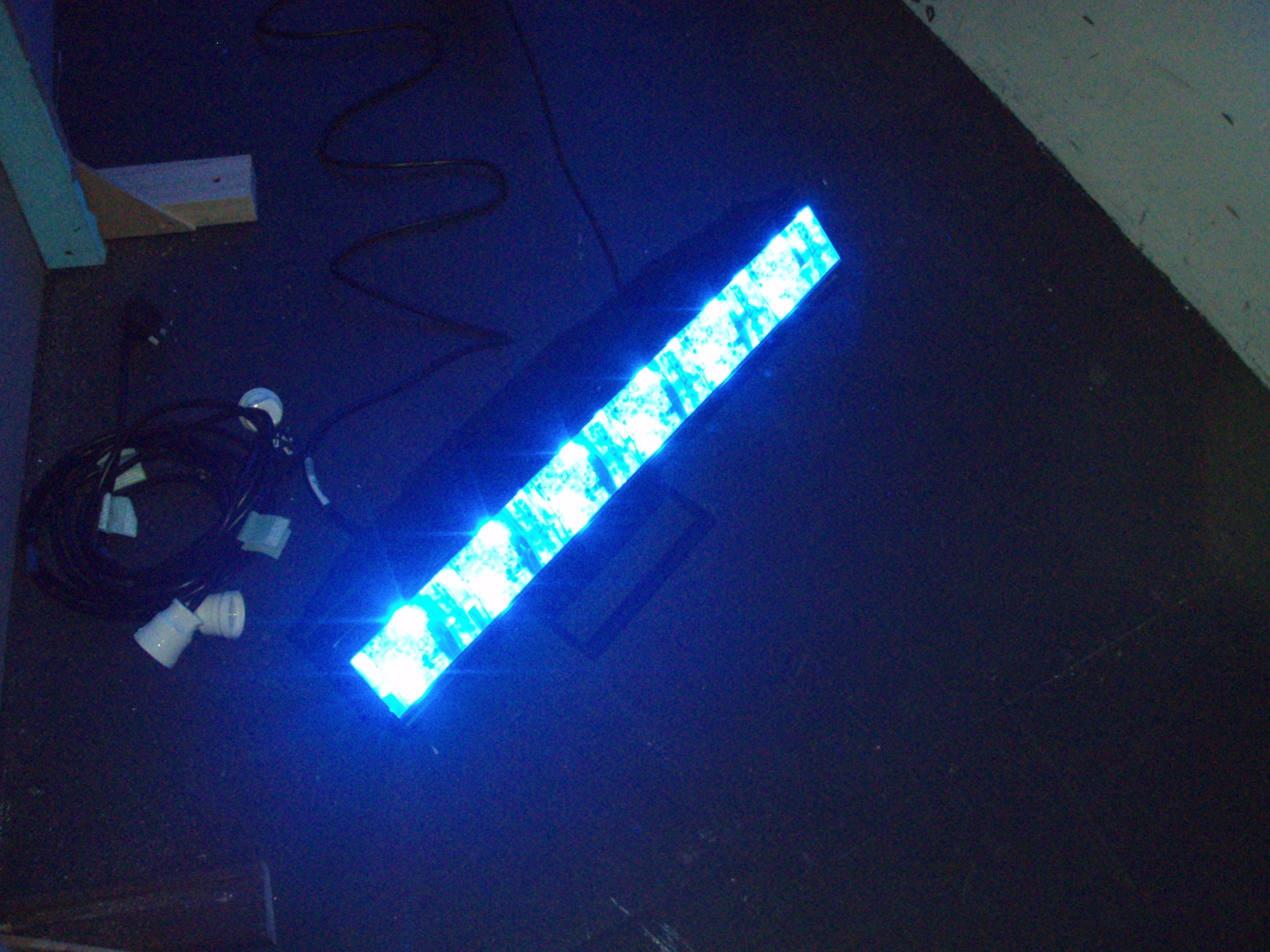
A front view of a Stagebar LED striplight

LED stage lighting instruments are stage lighting instruments that use light-emitting diodes (LEDs) as a light source. LED instruments are an alternative to traditional stage lighting instruments which use halogen lamp or high-intensity discharge lamps. Like other LED instruments, they have high light output with lower power consumption. Most LED fixtures use three or more colors (usually red, green, and blue) which can be mixed to hypothetically create any color.

===== Types =====
LED stage lights come in four main types. PAR cans, spotlights, striplights, and "moving head" types. In LED PAR cans, a round printed circuit board with LEDs mounted on is used in place of a PAR lamp. Moving head types can either be a bank of LEDs mounted on a yoke or more conventional moving head lights with the bulb replaced with an LED bank.

===== Uses =====
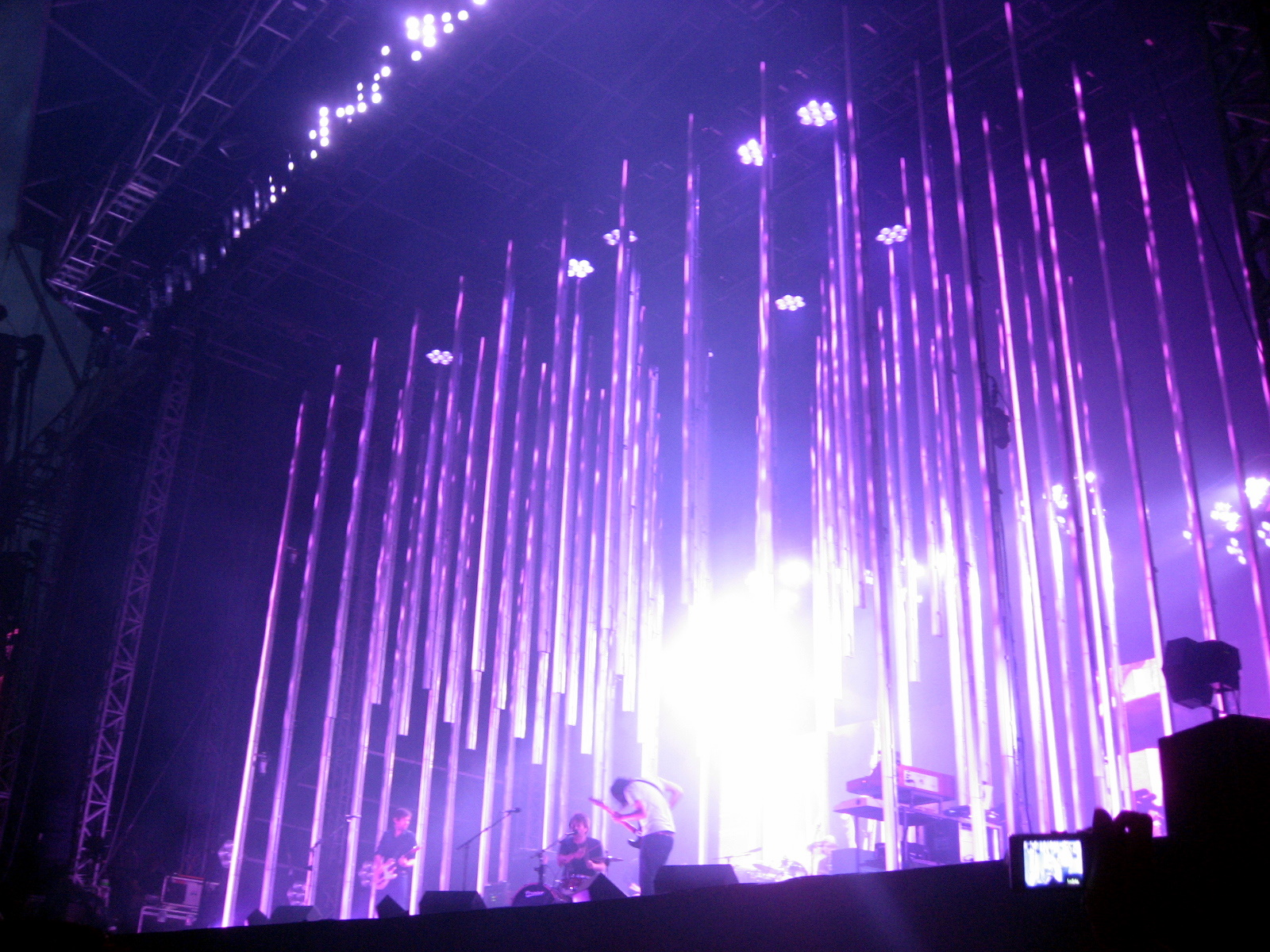
LED lighting instruments used on Radiohead's 2008 tour.

LED instruments can and have been used to replace any conventional lighting fixture, and some shows, such as Radiohead's 2008 tour, have used only LED lighting instruments. Most shows use LEDs only for lighting cycloramas, or as top, side, or back light due to their low throw distance. They can also be used as audience blinders (lights pointed directly at the audience from a low angle).

=== Spotlights ===
A spotlight is any lighting instrument used in theater to create a pool of light on the stage. There are many different types of spotlights which break down into three general areas:

- Fresnel lanterns or Fresnels (US) are small fixtures giving a soft-edged spot or pool of light. Their name comes from the distinctive ridged Fresnel lens used on the front.
- Profile spots (UK) or ellipsoidal reflector spotlights (US) tend to be longer fixtures containing convex lenses and having a gate at their focal point which enables the insertion of gobos or irises to shape the beam of light. They give a hard-edged beam most often associated in the public mind with "spotlights". Large versions are operated by a technician as a 'followspot' to follow performers on the stage. The term Profile Spot used in the UK refers to a focussing spotlight which may, or may not use the ellipsoidal reflector design, this design was not common in the UK until the 1970s and many UK and European manufacturers have still to adopt this design instead preferring a twin PC lens design.
- Pebble Convex lanterns (or "PCs") are similar to Fresnels, but use a plano-convex lens with a pebbled effect on the planar (flat) side, resulting in less "spill" outside the main beam. They are used much more widely in Europe than North America.

==== Fresnel lantern ====
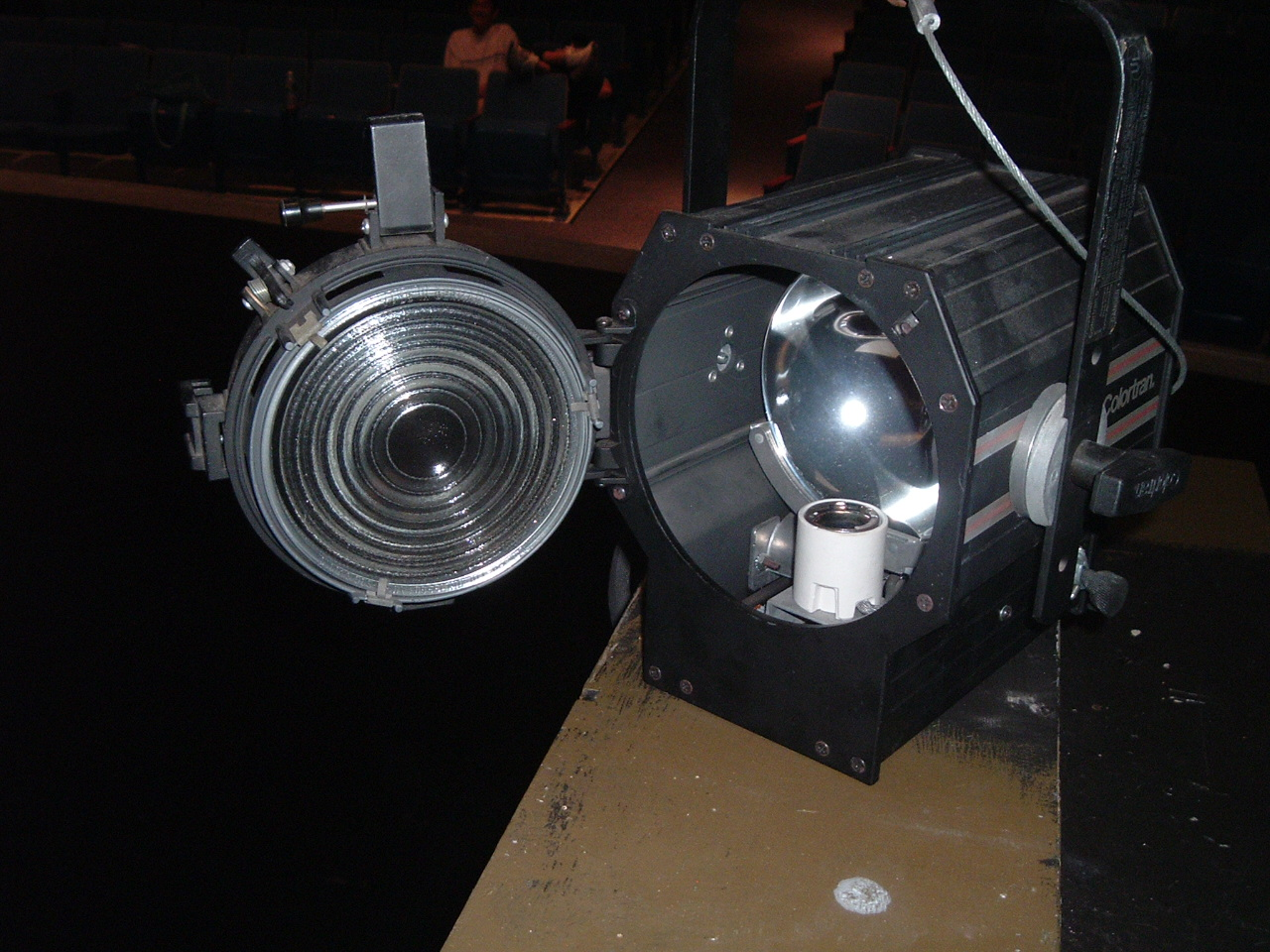
Fresnel with lens open to show stepped lens. There is no lamp in the instrument.

Left-Snoot Right-Barn Door

A Fresnel lantern (UK), or simply Fresnel (US), employs a Fresnel lens to wash light over an area of the stage. The lens is named after French physicist Augustin-Jean Fresnel, and consequently pronounced with a silent "s". The distinctive lens has a 'stepped' appearance instead of the 'full' or 'smooth' appearance of those used in other lanterns. The resulting beam of light is wide and soft-edged, creating soft shadows, and is commonly used for back light, top light, and side light. Another method of controlling the spread of light is to use either a top hat (also referred to as a snoot), which generally limits the light coming out, or a barn door, whose flaps work as though they were shutters on an ERS (shown on the right). These methods limit light output and keep excess light from spilling into the eyes of audience members or where it is not desired.

Fresnels use a spherical reflector, with the lamp at the focus point. The lamp and reflector remain a fixed unit inside the housing, and are moved forward and back to focus the light. This is accomplished using a slider on the bottom or side of the lantern, or using a worm track. At very tight focus, the lanterns are the least efficient, as the least light can escape the housing. Therefore, Fresnels are not good for tight focus on small areas. They are most often used at medium distances from the stage for area lighting.

In 1999, ETC introduced a new lighting fixture, the Source Four PARNel, which combined the design of the PAR fixture with that of the Fresnel. The fixture is more versatile, allowing for a flood or a softer spot.

==== Ellipsoidal reflector spotlight ====
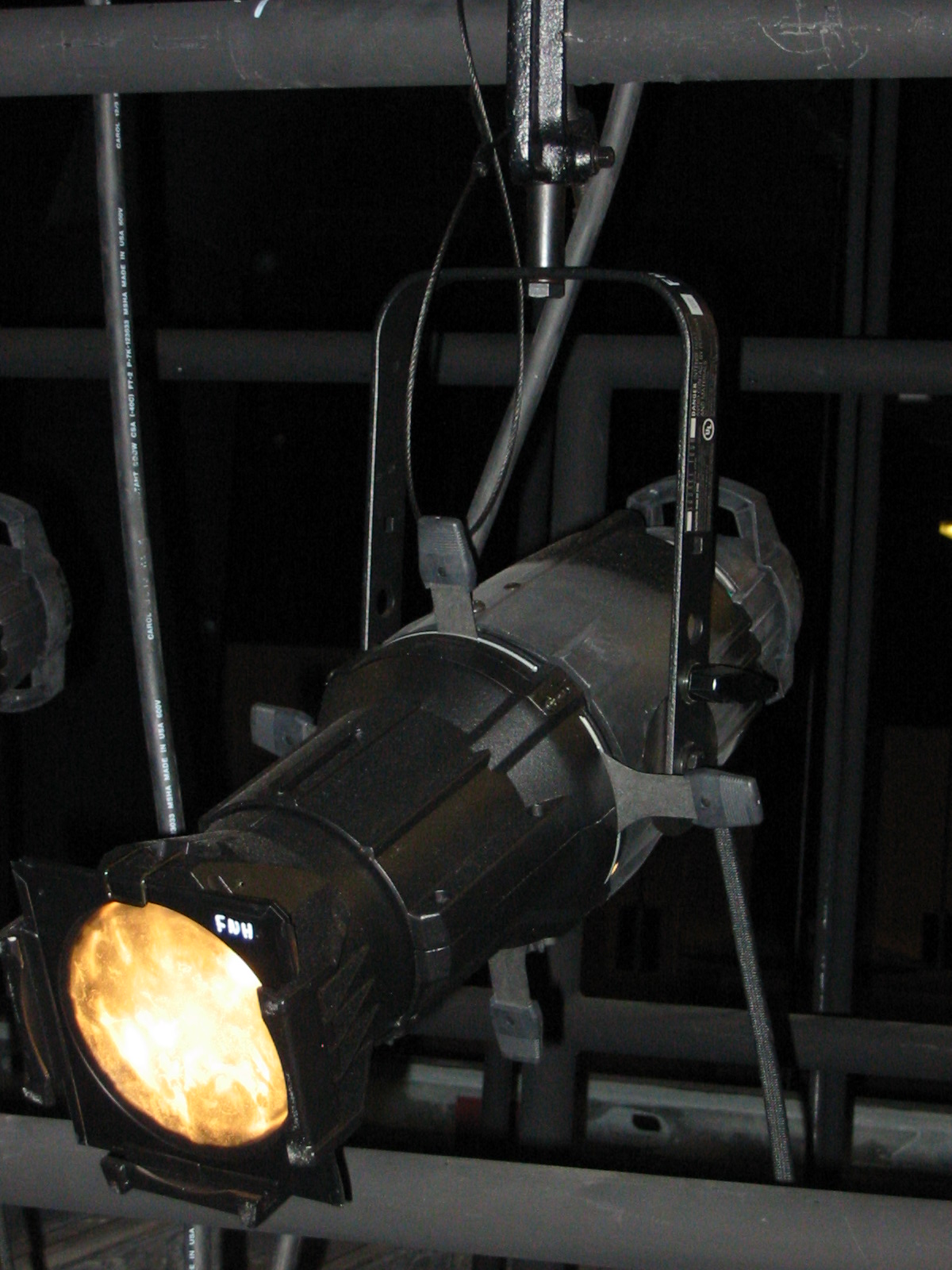
ETC Source Four ERS.

The ellipsoidal reflector spotlight (ERS), also known as profile (after its ability to project the silhouette or profile of anything put in the gate) (UK) and Découpe (French), is the most abundant instrument type currently in theatrical use. The flexibility of the ERS allows it to fulfill the bulk of lighting roles in the theater. They are sometimes known as a profile spotlight (in Europe) or by their brand names, especially the Source Four (a popular lantern from ETC) and 2 the Leko (short for Lekolite, from Strand lighting).

The major components of an ERS light are the casing in which the internal parts are mounted, an ellipsoidal reflector located in the back of the casing(truncated conical ellipse), a lamp mounted to position the filament at the rear focal point of the ellipsoid, a dual plano-convex lens (two plano-convex lenses facing each other in the barrel), and at the front, a gel frame to hold the color gel. The light from the lamp is efficiently gathered by the ellipsoidal reflector and sent forward through the gate, shutters and lens system.

A diagram of a Selecon Performance Lighting Pacific Zoomspot.

The truncated conical ellipse allows better focusing abilities for the light. If the bulb is placed in the first focus, then all light will pass through the second focus at the same time. This creates a very bright beam of light.

ERS or profile lanterns have many useful features. One of the most useful are the metal shutters at the focal plane of the lens to shape the beam of light. The original shape of the beam is round, but with the use of the shutters one can limit the beam to avoid obstacles or parts of the set that should not be illuminated in a specific look. Another feature is a gate, also in the focal plane, for sliding in gobos (also known as templates or deckles). These have patterns cut into them, like a stencil. These patterns are projected onto the stage. An iris also can be inserted in this position to make the beam smaller in diameter, reducing the light cast without the sharp edges of the shutters. ERS instruments from ETC, Altman, Selecon, and a variety of others have interchangeable lens tubes (or barrels) which can both create a very sharp or very soft beam as well as alter the beam spread. The barrel sizes can range from a narrow, long distance 5- or 10-degree spot to a broad and short-distance 50- or even 90-degree. The first 90-degree profile lantern was developed by Selecon Performance Lighting as part of their "Pacific" range of products. Since its introduction many other manufacturers have introduced their own 90-degree barrels. ERS instruments allow many different lens tubes to be used with the same body. This makes them more versatile, since a venue can purchase varying degrees of barrels without buying as many instruments. Many manufacturers also produce zoom lenses which offer the ability to change the beam angle. Some zoom ranges have a poorer optical quality making them difficult to use in sharp focus.

===== Field angle =====
The field angle of an instrument is the full angular width of the beam of light where it reaches 10% of the maximum luminous intensity. The direction of maximum intensity is often the center of the beam. Most manufacturers now use field angle to indicate the spread that the fixture has. However, older fixtures are described by the width of the lens x focal length of the instrument. For example, a 6x9 ellipsoidal would have a 6" lens and a focal length of 9" (creating an approximately 37° beam angle). This nomenclature was used because traditionally a larger lens directly equated with more light output. This is no longer necessarily true, so most manufacturers now identify their fixtures by beam angle and light output. As the field angle narrows, the instrument can either be used further from the stage to create a similarly sized beam as a closer, larger instrument, or it can be used from the same distance to create a smaller beam.

==== Beam projector ====
A beam projector is a lensless instrument with very little beam spread. It uses two reflectors. The primary reflector is a parabolic reflector and the secondary reflector is a spherical reflector. The parabolic reflector directs the light into nearly parallel beams, and the spherical reflector is placed in front of the lamp to reflect light from the lamp back to the parabolic reflector, which reduces spill. The result is an intense shaft of light that cannot be easily controlled or modified. The beam projector no longer is used to the extent that it once was, as newer fixtures and PAR lamps have created easier ways to produce the effect.

==== Followspot ====
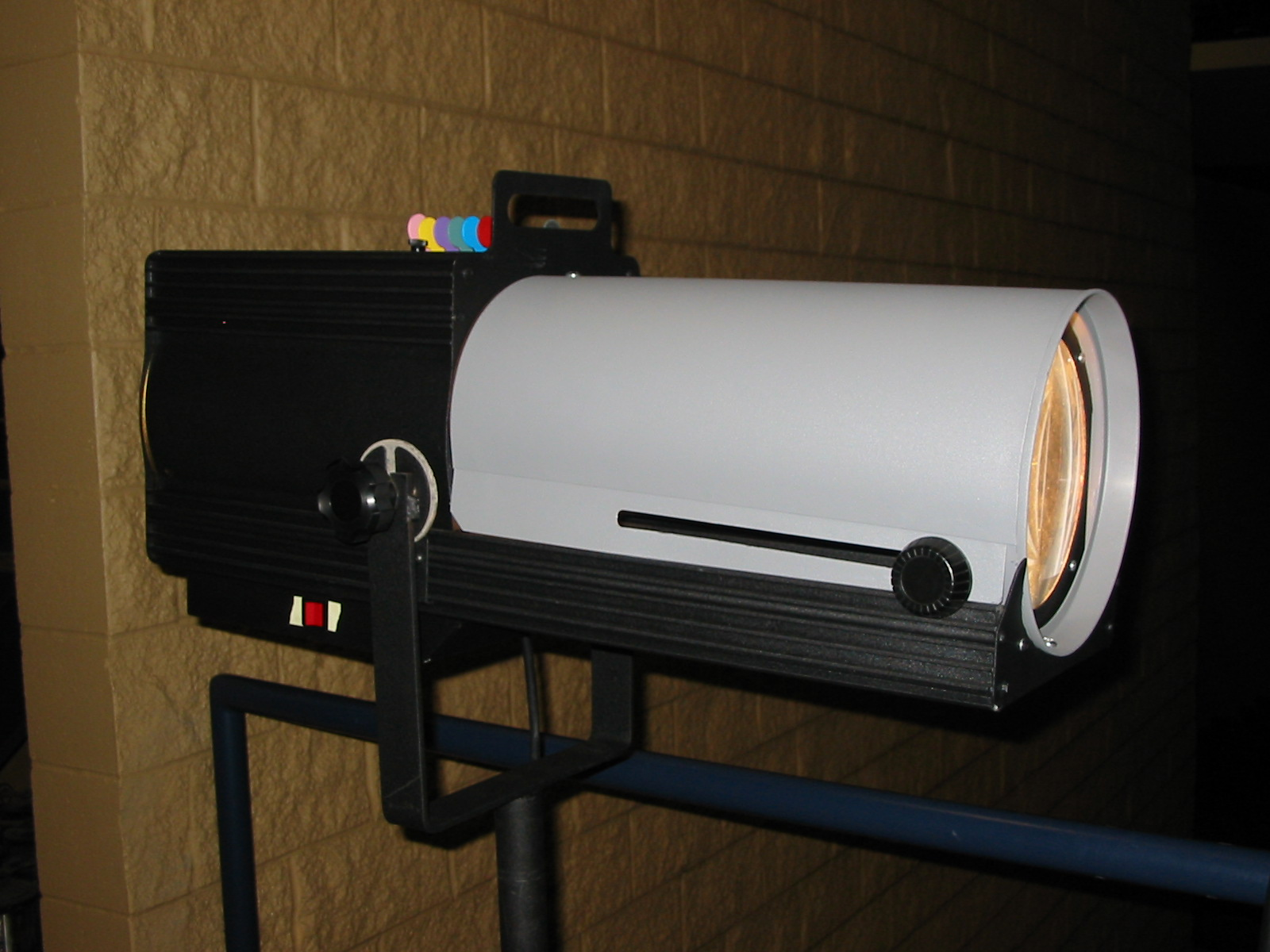
Followspot

The followspot (also called a spotlight, trackspot, lime (uk), or dome) is a lighting instrument that is moved during a performance by an operator or by DMX control to provide emphasis or extra illumination and usually to follow a specific performer moving around the stage. Follow spots are commonly used in musical theater and opera to highlight the stars of a performance, but may be used in dramas as well. They are also used in sports venues, as well as many other applications.

These lighting instruments come in a variety of sizes with light sources ranging from low power incandescent light bulbs to very powerful xenon arc lamps. Carbon arc lamp spots were common until the 1990s, using the arc between carbon rods as their light source. These follow spots required special installations that include high volume ventilation due to the hazardous fumes produced by the carbon arc. The current generation, xenon, has extremely high internal pressure in the lamp and thus has its own safety concerns.

Followspots contain a variety of operator-controlled optical mechanisms. They may include mechanical shutters, which allow the light to be doused without turning off the lamp, lenses to control and focus beam width, and internal color gels, often in a color magazine.

=== Intelligent lighting ===
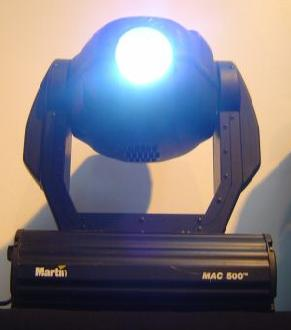
The MAC500 by Martin.

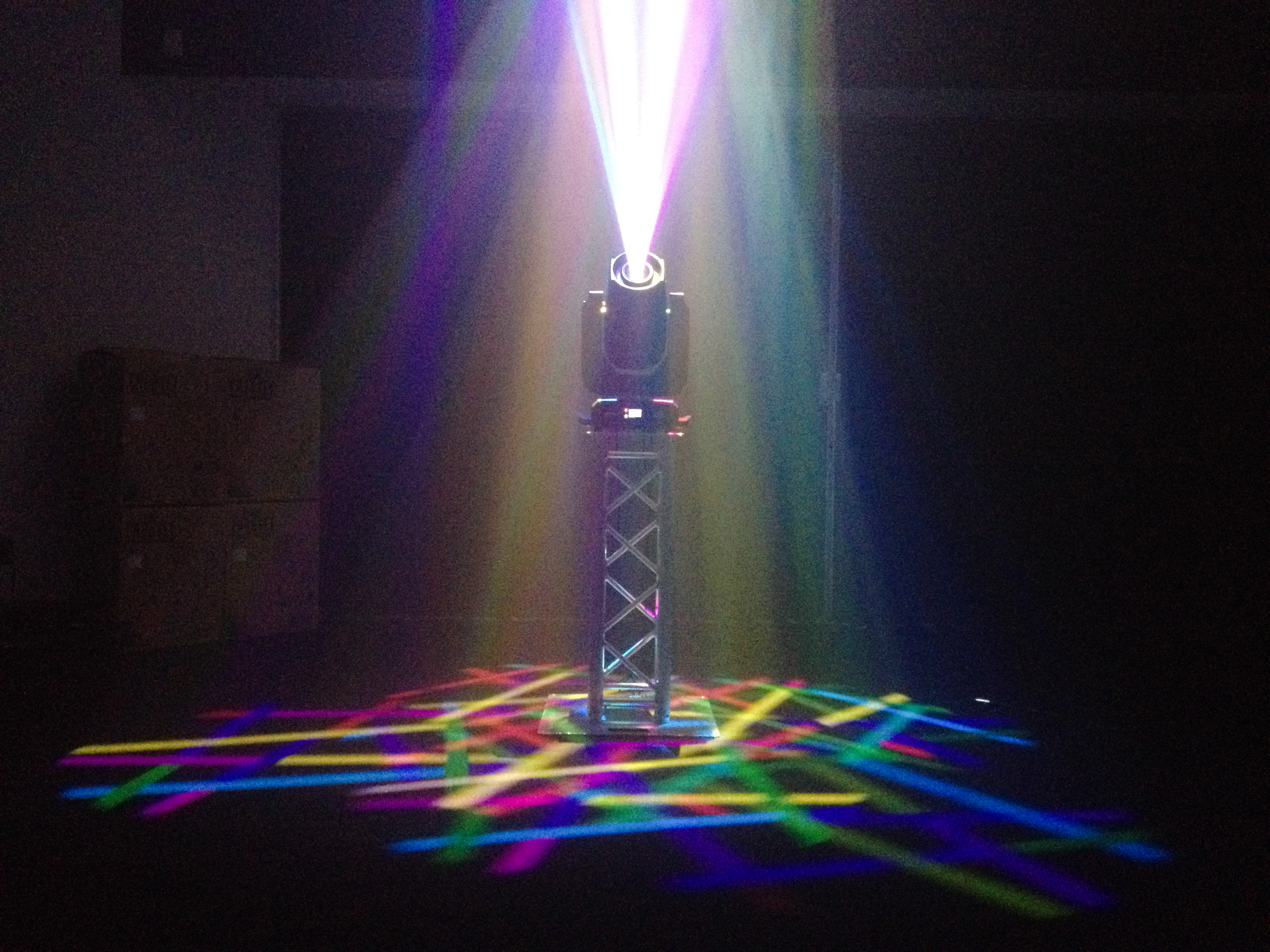
A Legend 330 SR Spot from CHAUVET Professional

Moving lights (or intelligent fixtures) began to gain widespread acceptance in the concert industry in the early 1980s. As the digital age progressed, the cost of these fixtures reduced, and they are increasingly used in many major theatrical productions.

Their principal feature is the ability to remotely control the movement and characteristics of the output beam of light. This is achieved by either moving a mirror which reflects the beam, or by moving the entire fixture, which can pan and tilt by means of a motorized yoke. Usually they also contain other controls to shape, texture and color the light, such as gobo or dichroic wheels. Almost all of the parameters are controlled by step motors. These are capable of very precise movement in either direction that can count a specific number of steps. This allows the fixture to quickly and accurately move. This ability to precisely, and repeatedly set the position of the fixture allows one light to perform many functions, lighting multiple different areas in different ways. They can also move 'live' (with the lamp on), to achieve many of the effects used in modern productions.

The majority of intelligent fixtures employ arc lamps as a light source, and therefore use a variety of mechanical methods to achieve the effect of dimming. Some fixtures employ standard halogen lamps. Mechanically, stepper motors connected to various internal optical devices (such as gobos and color wheels) manipulate the light before it escapes the fixture's front lens.

Discharge fixtures are seeing competitive advantages from the LED industry take place, and many companies are now offering an LED-based intelligent lighting fixture across all arenas of intelligent lighting genre, from wash fixtures to spot fixtures, beam-type fixtures and hybrid units that incorporate two or all of these types.

Moving light programs are often much more complex than that of stationary instruments. While it is possible to operate them with any console that uses the DMX512 Protocol, many lighting board operators find a console dedicated to moving light operation to be much more efficient. Oftentimes there will be encoder wheels which will control the Pan, Tilt, Focus, Zoom, Color, and Effects. Many people find visualization software (such as WYSWIG, VectorWorks, and others) to be helpful when programming while other people prefer a hard tactile control.

Intelligent lights are used heavily in shows in very large venues, like events in stadiums, where it is very difficult to reach lighting trusses for manual focusing. Although the fixtures may not be moved during the run of the show, they are focused remotely.

DMX512 is a standard from the United States Institute for Theatre Technology (USITT). It is a recommended practice to allow lighting systems to "talk." Before DMX512, every manufacturer had its own means of controlling their fixtures. This was inconvenient being that many theatres do not use lights from one single company.
