= Scoop (theater) =

Lighting fixture

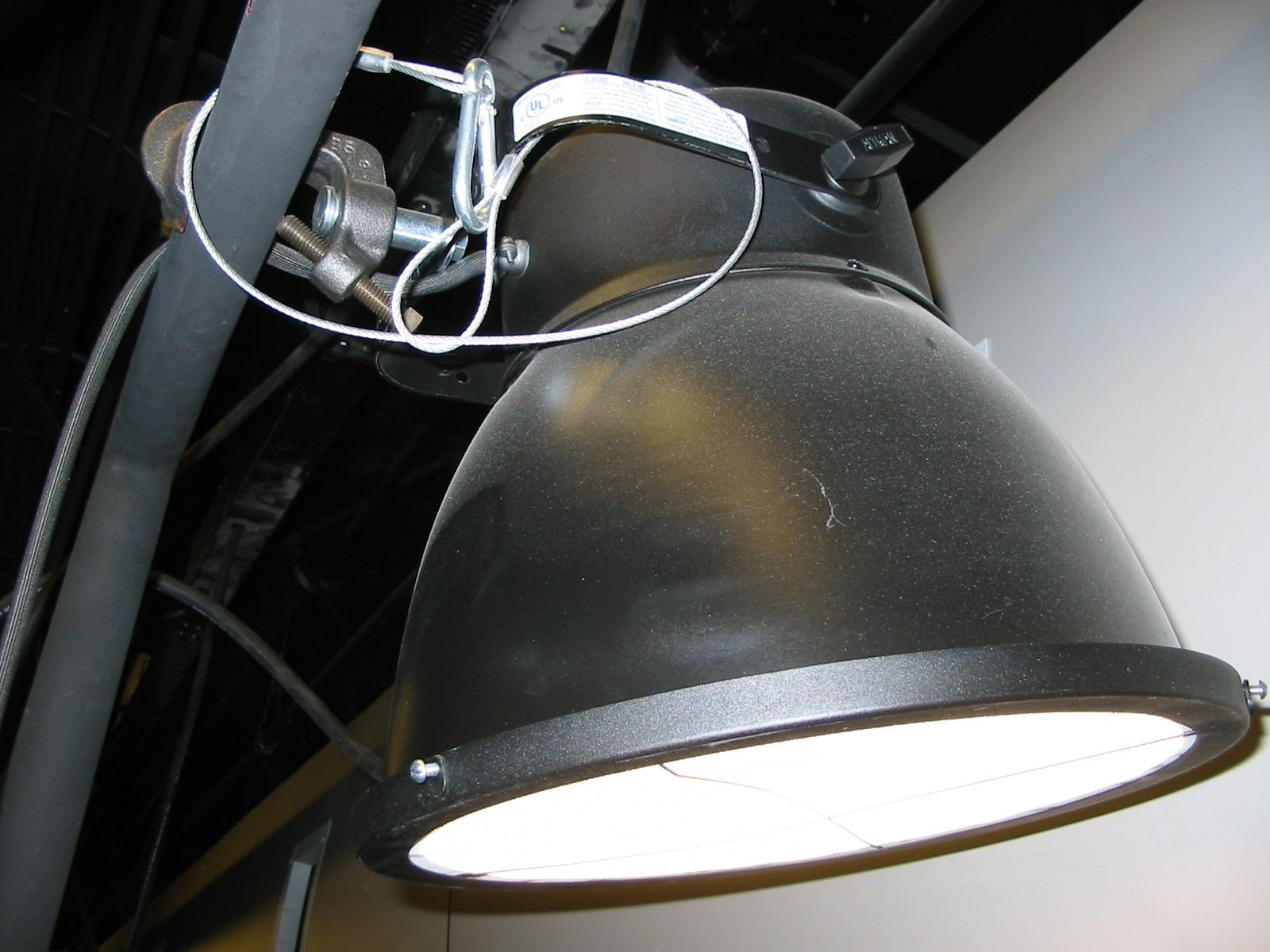
Scoop

In stage lighting, an ellipsoidal reflector, ERF (pronounced "erf"), or scoop, is a large, simple lighting fixture with a dome-like reflector, large high-wattage lamp and no lens.

== Design ==
The light is a type of floodlight, and is the simplest type of floodlight in use at theatres.

These fixtures have ellipsoidal reflectors. The reflector is matte, not polished, giving the light produced by the fixture a diffuse quality. The reflector can be made of either untreated spun metal or be painted with flat white paint.

Scoops are generally larger fixtures, although a 14-inch, 750 watt size is standard. Wattages can range from 250 watts for 10-inch scoops, to 2000 watts for 18-inch fixtures.

The fixture produces a wide, soft-edged pool of light that can be blended well with other sources of light. Some scoops have the ability to be focused between a spot and flood focus. However, most scoop lights do not have a mechanism for cutting down the size of their beam.

== Usage ==
Scoops can be used to provide backlight to cycloramas given their ability to blend and provide an even wash. Designers can also choose to use multiple series of scoops, each in a different color, to provide different-colored washes at different times. They can also be used as worklights on stage.

== See also ==
- Stage lighting instrument
