= Stage lighting accessories =

Stage lighting accessories are components manufactured for conventional (non-automated) stage lighting instruments. Most conventional fixtures are designed to accept a number of different accessories designed to assist in the modification of the output. These accessories are intended to either provide relatively common functionality not originally provided in a fixture (such as beam shaping through barn doors), or to extend the versatility of a lighting instrument by introducing features. Other accessories have been designed to overcome limitations or difficulties some fixtures present in specific applications.

All stage lighting accessories fall into one of three distinct categories: components installed inside the fixture, components affixed to the front of the fixture (in front of the lens), or components mounted elsewhere on the exterior of a fixture (to the side, top or bottom).

== External ==
=== Barn doors ===
Barn doors, or occasionally a set of barn doors, are an attachment fitted to the front of a Fresnel lantern, a type of lantern used in films, television, and theatres. The attachment has the appearance of a large set of barn doors, but in fact there are four leaves, two larger and widening on the outside, two smaller and getting narrower towards the outside. They facilitate shaping of the beam of light from the fixture, and prevent the distinctive scatter of light created by the Fresnel lens from spilling into areas where it is not wanted, such as the eyes of audience members.

Barn doors are mounted with a ring that fits inside of the color gel slot on the instrument. Because of this, barn doors have a gel slot built into them, so the light can still be colored. Depending on the size and local practices, barn doors may be attached to the pipe or the instrument with their own safety cable.

In some parts of the UK, Barn doors are referred to as "Harris Flaps"

A top hat (left) and barn doors (right) used in theatrical lighting.

Barn doors are generally not used with "profile" or "ellipsoidal reflector" spotlights because they have internal shutters which work more effectively. Barn doors are not effective at shaping the light of a PAR lights and a narrower lens would be a better way to do this.

=== Top hat ===
A top hat, also known as a stove pipe or snoot, is a device used in theatrical lighting to shield the audience's eyes from the direct source of the light. It is shaped like a top hat with a hole in the top, and the brim being inserted into the gel frame holder on a lighting instrument. The cylinder allows light to pass through but takes away the glint halation of a lighting instrument facing the audience. It also reduces flare created by the light, which is often useful when the unit is hung near the proscenium or other objects that the designer does not want to light.

There are also half-hats or "eyelashes", which function in a similar manner but have only half the cylinder, and short hats, which are shorter in length. Half hats are designed to split the difference between using one or not and has the extended side towards the audience. This also is to help cut down on the glare and distraction of light at the lens as it exits the light fixture.

Top hats are manufactured for most stationary lighting instruments with gel frames of varying sizes. While rare they may be found on automated Intelligent lighting instruments as well. Their use is in mainly in theatrical performance venues than with touring musical concerts rigs.

=== Gel extender ===
Gel extenders are similar to top hats in appearance, being a tube placed over the end of a lighting fixture. Unlike top hats, however, gel extenders have a colour frame holder built into the end to allow color gel to be mounted. Gel extenders are also available in a conical shape which does not constrict the beam of light output from the fixture at all.

=== Colour frame ===
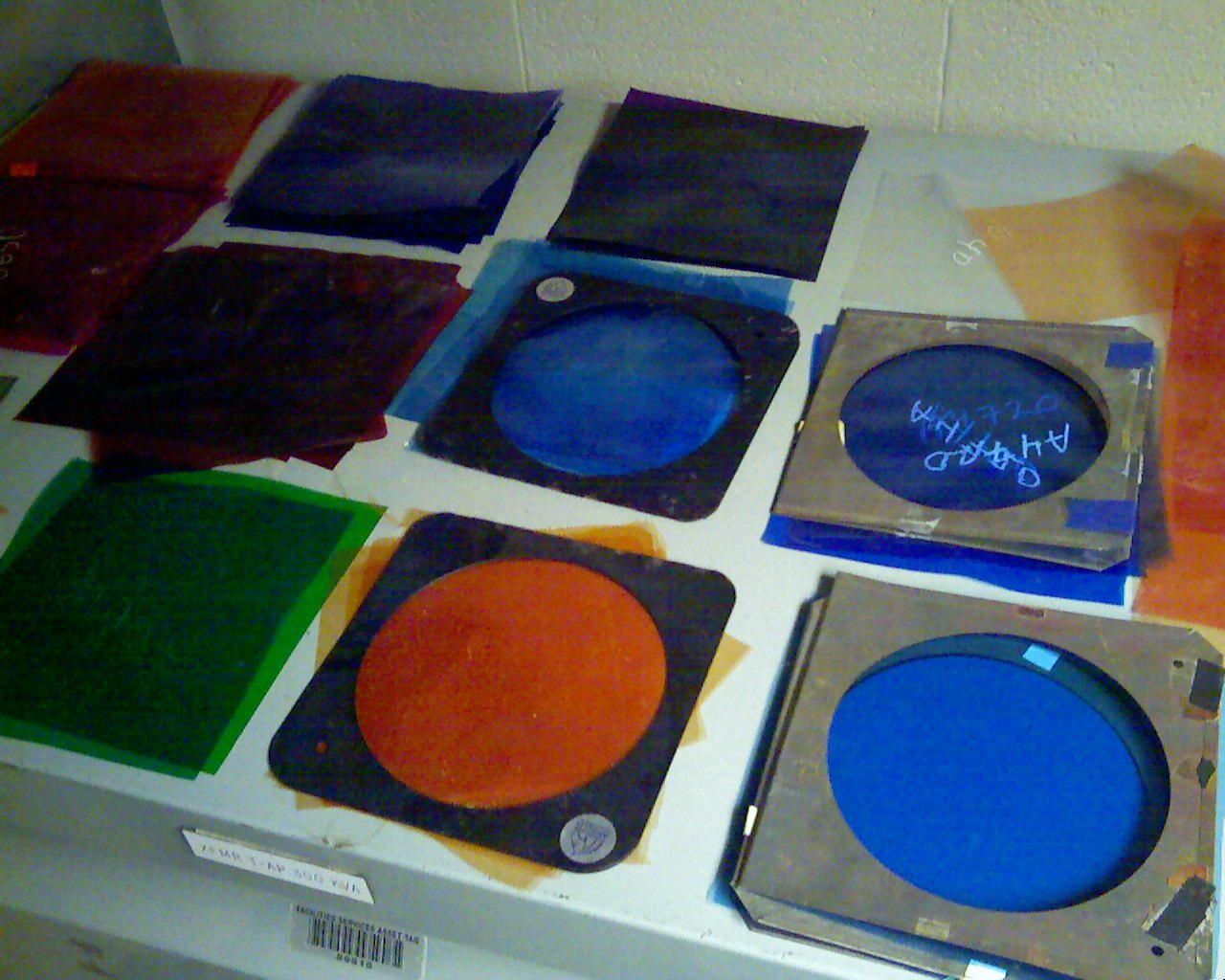
Gel Frames and color gels

A colour frame or gel frame is a piece of folded material, made from either metal or cardboard, designed to hold colour media (gel). Colour frames are placed directly outside the fixture, immediately in front of lens assembly. Most fixtures include an integrated holder for the frame. Some accessories designed to mount in the gel frame holder, such as Barn Doors, occasionally include an integrated replacement slot for frames.

Comes in many different sizes for all types of lanterns including, profiles, fresnels, floods and par cans

=== Doughnut ===
A doughnut, or donut, is a thin metal or cardboard panel, similar in shape and appearance to a colour frame, but with a small diameter hole intended to reduce off-axis rays of light being projected from a fixture. This increases sharpness of the light by reducing the effect of imperfect lenses. Doughnuts are designed to fit into the colour frame holder directly outside the fixture, immediately in front of lens assembly. Because they are typically thin, doughnuts can often be placed in the same slot as a gel frame. Doughnuts are typically used in fixtures in order to sharpen the beam when a template is in place.

=== Color scroller ===
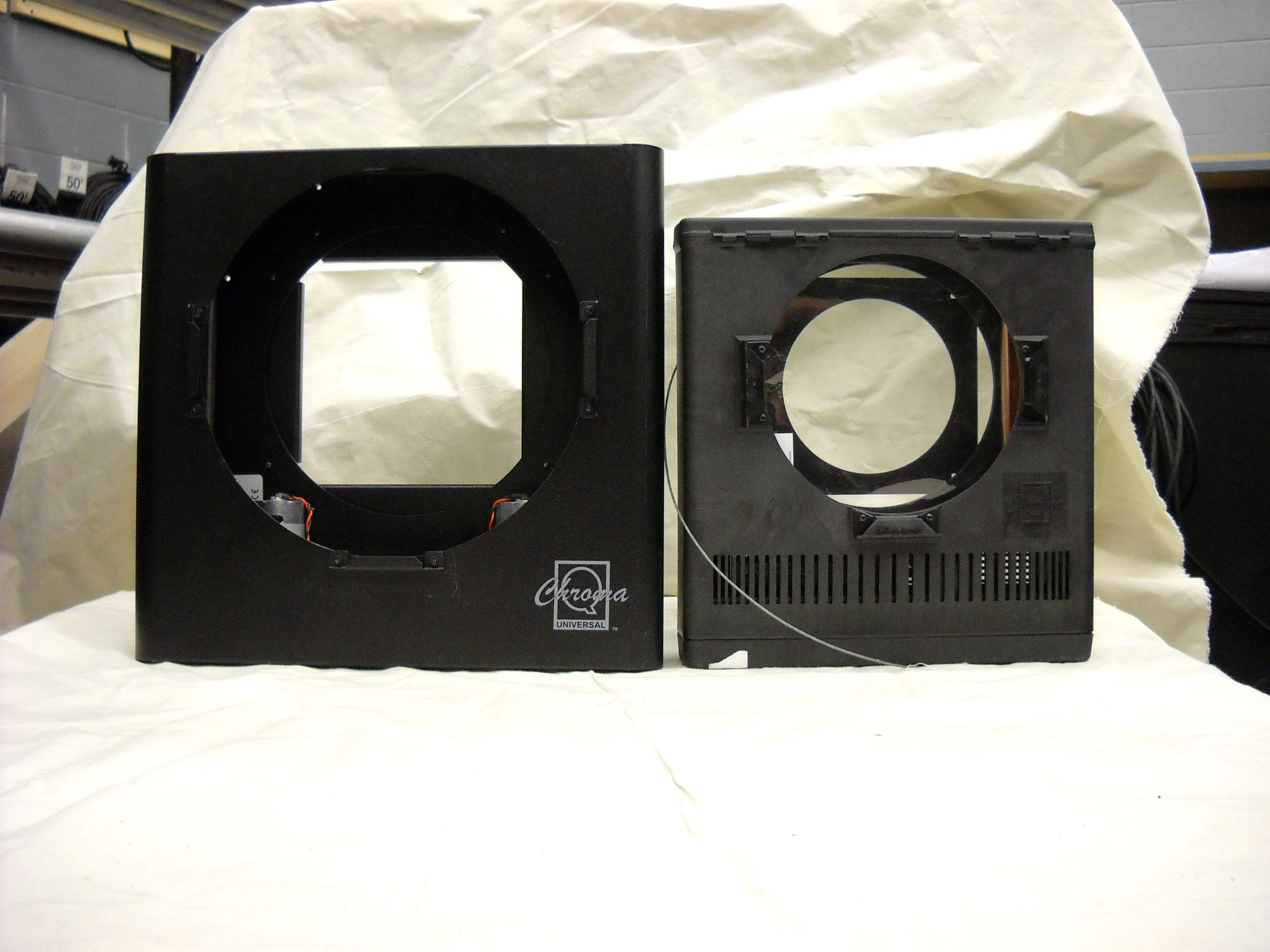
A 6" and 8" color scroller.

A color scroller, color changer, or "scroller" is a lighting accessory used to change color gels on stage lighting instruments without the need of a person to be in the vicinity of the light. It is attached in the gel frame holder on the outside of a lighting instrument, immediately in front of lens assembly. The "scroll" of colours inside the colour changer allows a single fixture to output several different colours, or no colour, and to rapidly change between colours on command. Most scrollers are controlled via DMX512 protocol, but some newer models also utilize the RDM protocol.

=== Moving mirror attachment ===
A moving mirror attachment is an ellipsoidal spotlight accessory that allows you to remotely re-position the beam of light, so that a single luminaire in a fixed position can be used for multiple "specials" in dozens of locations. Two of the most prominent models are the Elipscan by Meteor and the Rosco I-Cue.

=== Other ===
Beam Bender
A beam bender is essentially a large adjustable mirror, mounted into the color slot on the front of a lighting fixture. It is designed to allow a fixture to be mounted at right angles to the desired direction to be lit and have the output reflected (bent) accordingly.
Drop in Boomerang
A Boomerang, also known as a Color magazine is a series of colored filters on hinges. A "Drop in Boomerang" is designed to mount into the color slot of a lighting fixture and provide the operator with several manually selected gels. Most often this accessory is seen in conjunction with the followspot yoke, when a fixture is being used as a small replacement followspot.

== Internal ==
=== Pattern holder ===
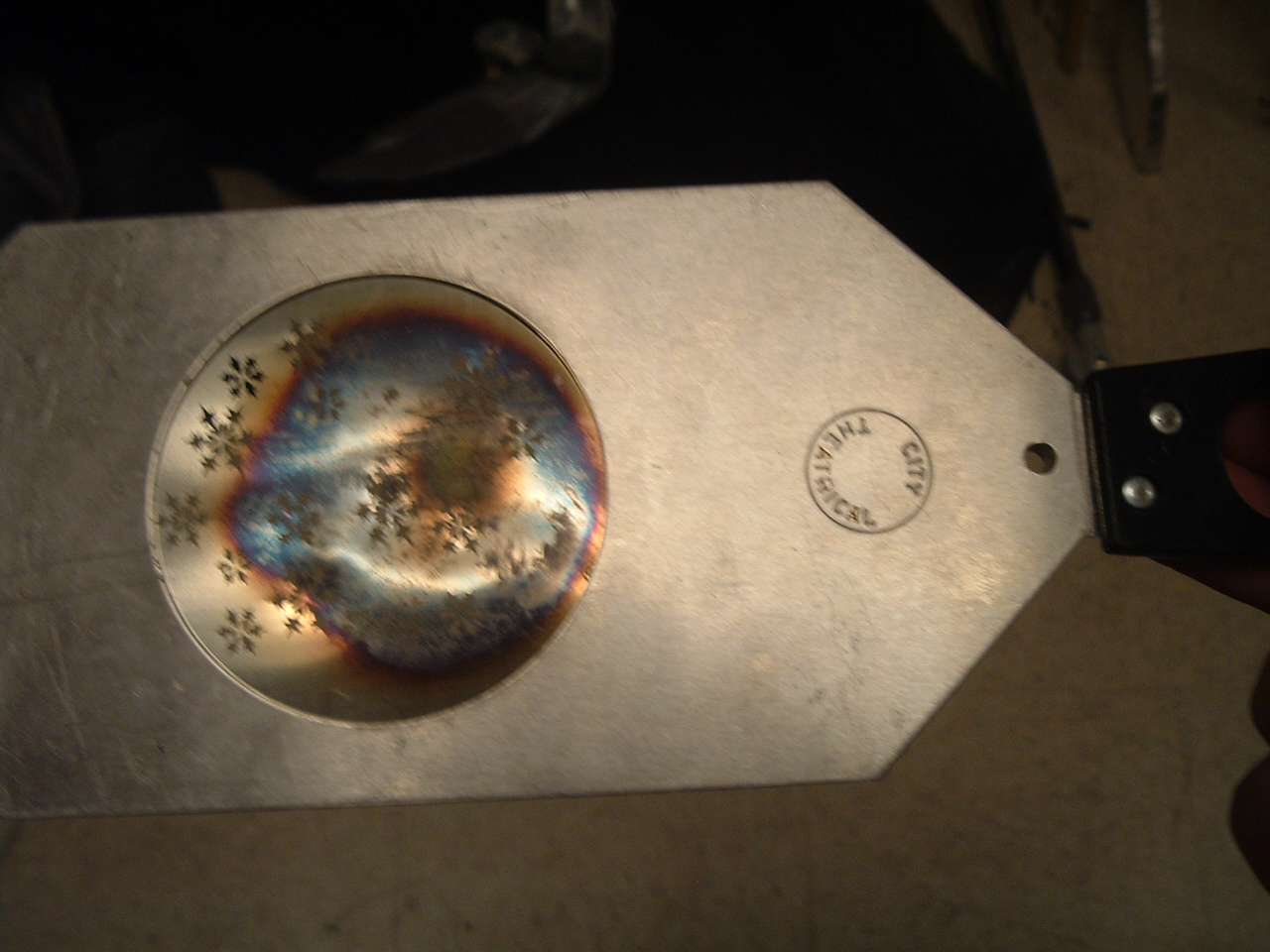
A (used) gobo in a gobo holder

A pattern holder or gobo holder, is a metal frame designed to hold a gobo. Gobo holders are placed inside a fixture through a specifically designed opening, which places the pattern directly in the focal plane of the fixture. By placing the pattern inside of the focal plane of a fixture adjustments to image (hard or soft edges) can easily be created. Larger pattern holders are also available designed to mount into the accessory slot on some fixtures, allowing for the use of larger gobos, or the projection of two overlapping patterns from a single fixture.

=== Gobo rotator ===
Gobo rotators are metal frames designed to hold a gobo. They have a much larger cross-section (thicker) than a regular gobo holder due to the motors and gearing required to facilitate rotation. Because of their increased thickness, gobo rotators are not placed inside fixture through the specifically designed opening (the gobo slot) but instead install into the accessory (iris) slot. Installing the rotator in the accessory slot still places the pattern inside the focal plane of a fixture, allowing adjustments to the image (creating hard or soft edges). All gobo rotators require an external power source, separate from the lighting fixtures power. Many models allow for remote DMX512 control of motor, permitting fine control of rotation speed and orientation of pattern. Features can also include uni- or bi-directional control of the rotation of a pattern, as well as indexing (tracking a patterns position to return it to the same orientation repeatedly.) Several models are available which can hold two patterns simultaneously, and may allow patterns to rotate separately or in opposite directions.

=== Iris ===
The iris is a metal frame housing designed with an adjustable shutter assembly (an iris). The iris is placed inside fixtures through a specifically designed opening, the accessory (or iris) slot. The iris is placed inside focal plane of fixture, before the lens assembly. An iris is designed to reduce diameter of beam emitted from fixture. The iris assembly is different from the donut as it adjusts the diameter of the beam, not the amount of off-axis light emitted.

=== Effects loop ===
Gam Products Inc. manufactures two different models of effect loop, the Film/FX and the SX4. Both of these devices use a ribbon punched with a pattern to project a continuous scrolling pattern. The Film/FX is designed to install into the accessory slot, while the SX4 is installed directly into the fixture, between the lamp assembly and barrel.

=== Color changers ===
Colormerge
High End System's manufactured the Colormerge as a color mixing unit made to be used with the ETC Source Four ellipsoidal fixture. Unlike a traditional color scroller, it is installed inside the unit between the lamp assembly and shutters. It provides CMY color mixing via dichroic glass plates, controlled thorough DMX512. It was discontinued in 2004.
SeaChanger
The SeaChanger line by Ocean Thin Films is a color mixing unit intended to be installed into the ETC Source Four. The SeaChanger unit completely replaces the shutter assembly of a Source Four fixture, retaining only the lens barrel and lamp assembly. Variations of the SeaChanger line replace (alternately) the lens barrel or lamp assembly with integrated components, essentially creating a whole new fixture. The SeaChanger allows you to customize the wheels for added color possibilities.

== External chassis ==
=== Followspot yoke ===
The followspot yoke is an oversized replacement yoke intended to allow an ellipsoidal reflector spot to be installed into a followspot stand and be used as a small, short throw followspot. Generally these yokes allow a much wider range of tilt than a conventional yoke, and have had the hole for a c-clamp bolt replaced with a spigot for a spot stand.

=== City Theatrical AutoYoke ===
City Theatrical manufactures a complete assembly which essentially turns a conventional fixture into an automated fixture. The autoyoke is a DMX512 operated assembly which provides complete remote pan and tilt control of a fixture. The autoyoke is also designed to control other accessories, including color changers and iris units.

=== Apollo Design RightArm ===
The Right Arm adds pan and tilt capabilities to a wide range of static theatrical and studio lighting fixtures, allowing the designer to maximize the lighting rig without crowding fixtures or over-extending the budget. Video cameras and LCD projectors can be blended into the lighting rig with minimal preparation, providing easy adjustment from the lighting console. The Right Arm conveniently repositions these devices in theatrical and church productions, corporate events, trade shows - anywhere flexibility in the light plot is needed.

== See also ==
- Lens hood – still cameras
- Matte box – video cameras

== Sources ==
- Friedman, Sally (1994). Backstage Handbook: an illustrated almanac of technical information, Broadway Press
- Shelley, Steven Louis (2009). A Practical Guide to Stage Lighting, Second Edition, Focal Press
