= Striplight =

Multi-circuit stage lighting instrument

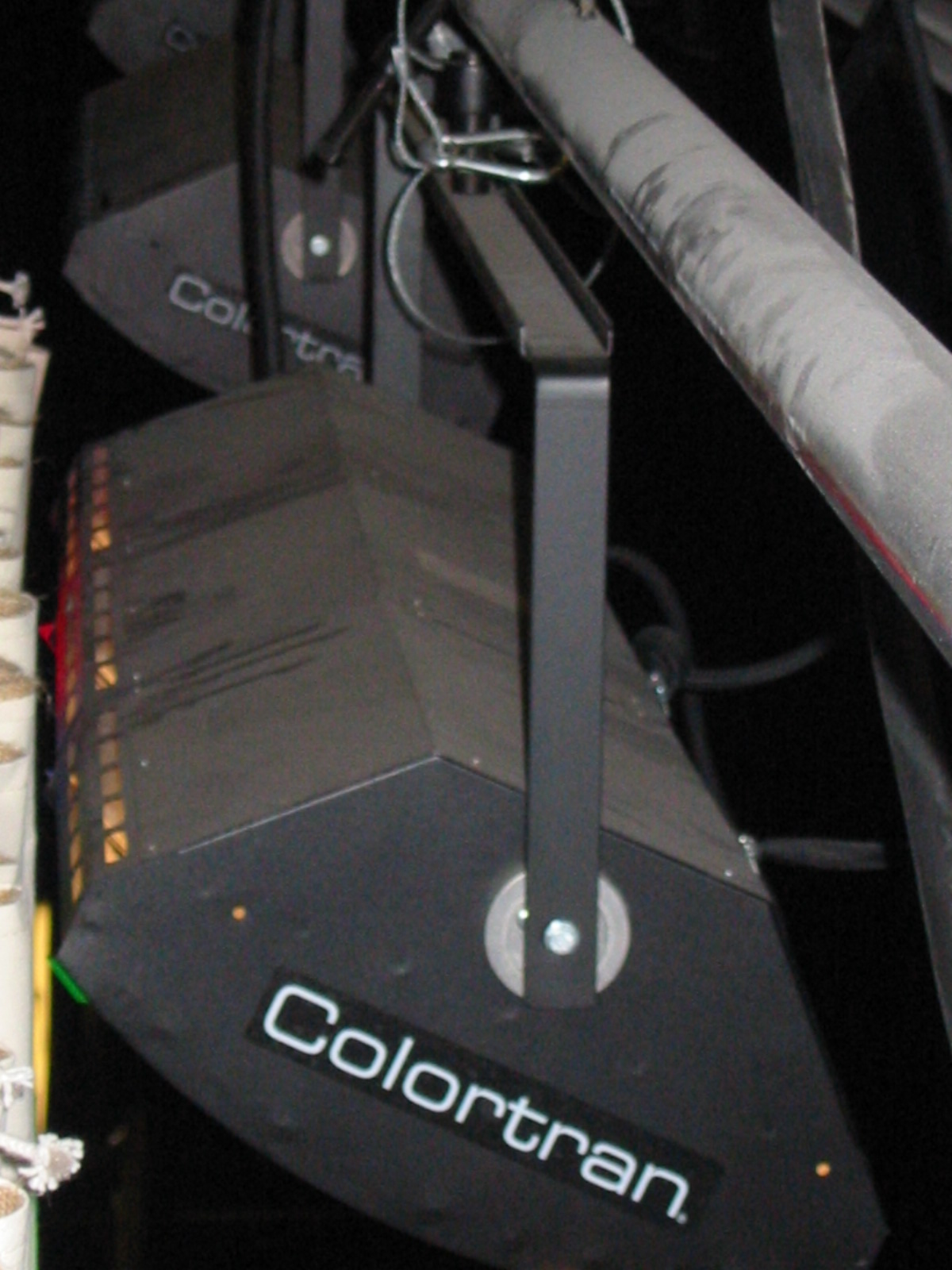
Striplight boxes above a stage

A strip light is a multi-circuit stage lighting instrument. Striplights are one of the most basic types of lighting fixtures available. They usually consist of row of lamps. A single striplight is usually wired internally into either three or four circuits. Each internal circuit consists of several lamps evenly spaced within the unit. Often, a lighting designer will use roundels (colored glass lenses) or gels to make these lights different colors. The unit can then be wired into several different circuits, allowing each bank of colored lights to be controlled by a separate dimmer on the lighting board. Striplights are often used to color a cyclorama, or can alternately be positioned behind the proscenium arch to provide a general overhead color wash.

Often, in older and low budget venues such as churches and schools, striplights are the primary lighting source. Nowadays, LED striplights are becoming more common. These units can deliver a similar light output with reduced power consumption. They also eliminate the need for roundels or gels.

== See also ==
- Softbox
- Stage lighting
- Stage lighting instrument
- LED stage lights
- LED strip light
