= Cyclorama (theater) =

Large concave curtain or wall at the back of a stage

In theater and film, a cyclorama (abbreviated cyc in the U.S., Canada, and the UK) is a large curtain or wall, often concave, positioned at the back of the apse. It often encircles or partially encloses the stage to form a background. The word cyclorama stems from the Greek words kyklos, meaning circle, and orama, meaning view. It was popularized in the German theater of the 19th century and continues in common usage today in theaters throughout the world. It can be made of unbleached canvas (larger versions) or muslin (smaller versions), filled scrim (popularized on Broadway in the 20th century), or seamless translucent plastic. Traditionally it is hung at 0% fullness (flat). When possible, it is stretched on the sides and weighted on the bottom to create a flat and even surface. As seams tend to interrupt the smooth surface of the cyclorama, it is usually constructed from extra-wide material. Cycloramas are also used in photography and architecture.

In photography, cycloramas or cycs also refer to curving backdrops which are white to create the illusion of no background, or green for chroma keying.

An infinity cyclorama (found particularly in television and in film stills studios) is a cyc which curves smoothly at the bottom to meet the studio floor, so that with careful lighting and the corner-less joint, the illusion that the studio floor continues to infinity can be achieved. An example of this would be in Apple's advertisement series Get a Mac, in which two actors stand in front of a cyclorama representing a Mac and a PC. Popular TV show The Mandalorian uses a cutting edge cyclorama to create a 3D render of the fictional planet the scene is set in, allowing for actors to feel immersed while filming.

Cycloramas are often used to create the illusion of a sky onstage. By varying the equipment, intensity, color and patterns used, a lighting designer can achieve many varied looks. A cyclorama can be front lit or, if it is constructed of translucent and seamless material, backlit directly or indirectly with the addition of a white "bounce" drop. To achieve the illusion of extra depth, often desirable if one is re-creating a sky, the cyclorama can be paired with a "sharkstooth scrim" backdrop. A dark or black scrim, by absorbing the extraneous light which is commonly reflected off the floor of the stage can further achieve deeper colors on the cyclorama. Cycloramas are also often illuminated during dance concerts to match the mood of a song.

One documented use of the cyclorama was made by Irene Sharaff for the 1932 Broadway production of Alice in Wonderland.

== See also ==
- Cyclorama Building (Boston) – 1884 building in the South End of Boston, Massachusetts, United States
- Painted photography backdrops – Feature of early photography studios
- Stage lighting – Craft of lighting at performances
- Striplight – Multi-circuit stage lighting instrument
- Theater drapes and stage curtains – Large piece of cloth designed to mask backstage areas of a theater from spectators
