= Ellipsoidal reflector spotlight =

Type of stage illumination

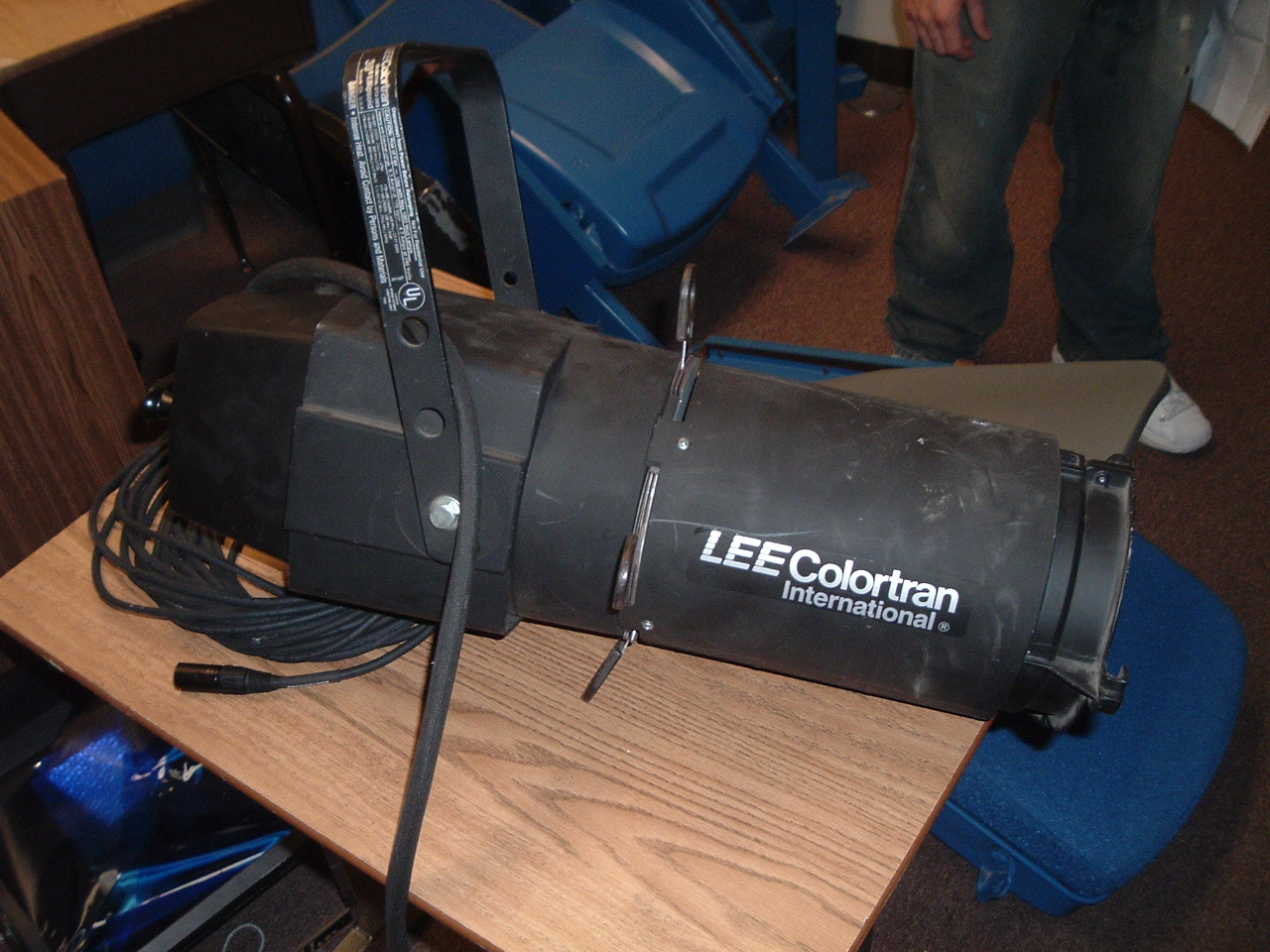
A Colortran ERS.

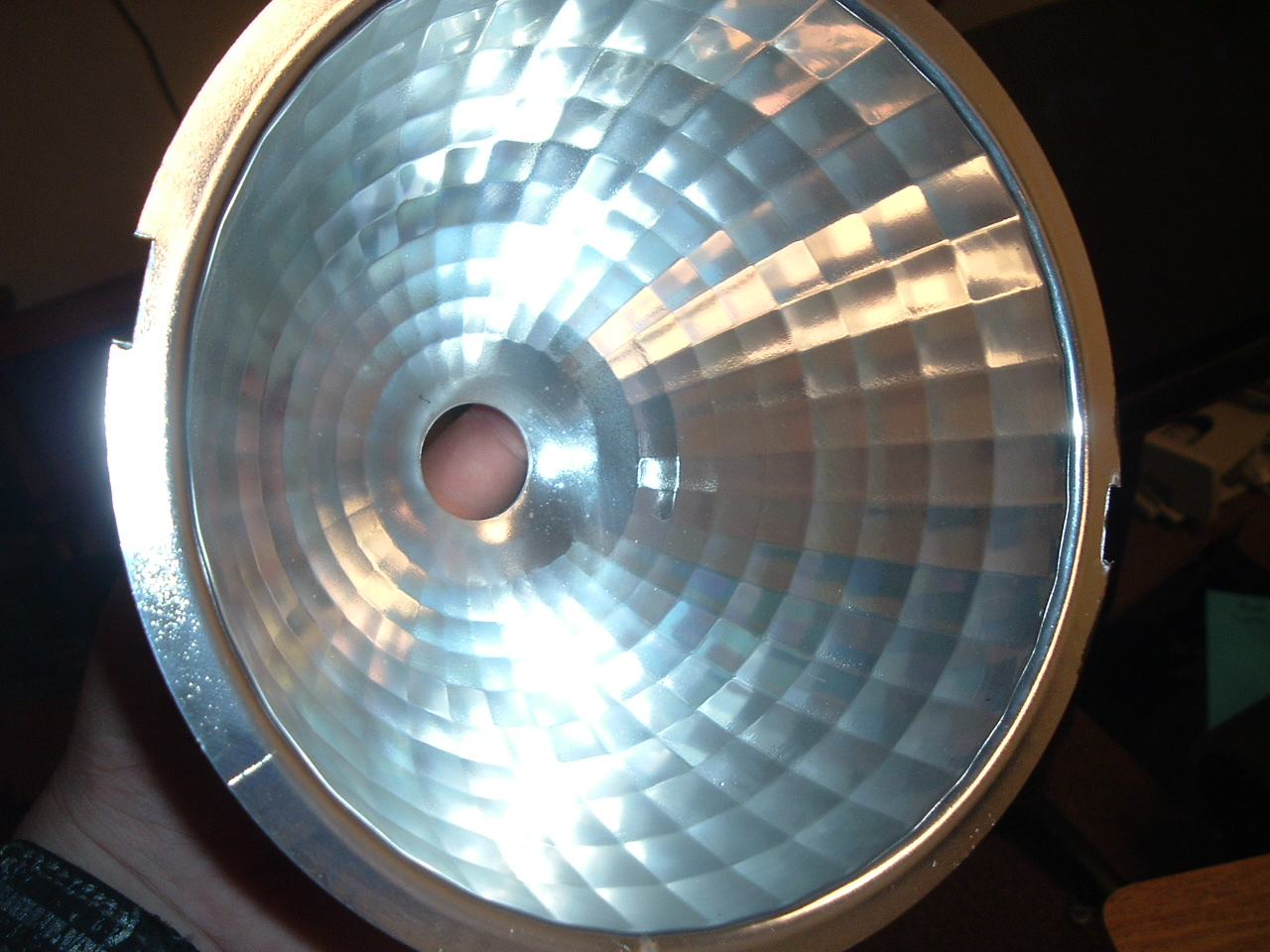
An Ellipsoidal Reflector from a Leko

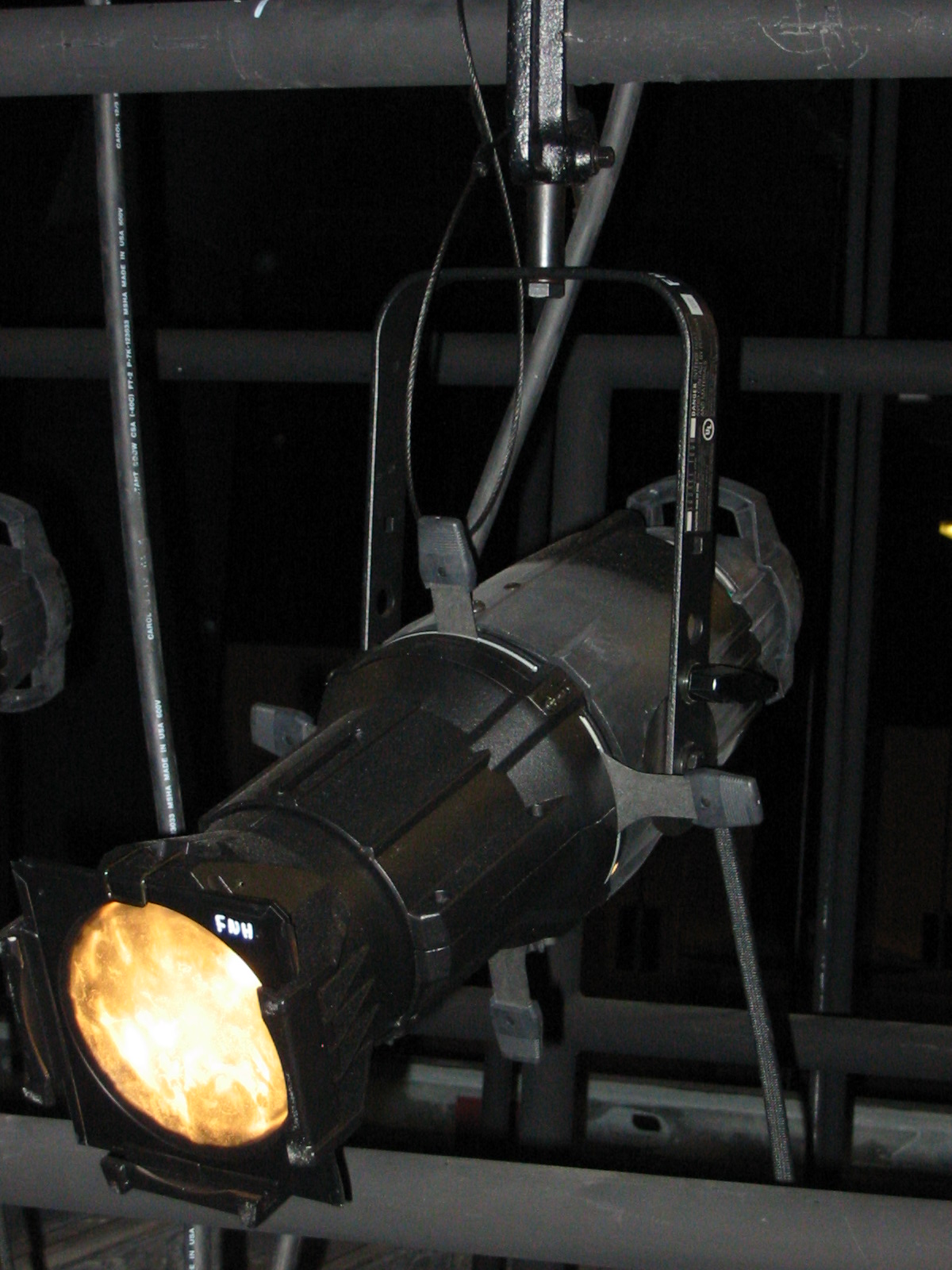
Source Four ERS

Ellipsoidal reflector spot (abbreviated to ERS, or colloquially ellipsoidal or ellipse) is the name for a type of stage lighting instrument, named for the ellipsoidal reflector used to collect and direct the light through a barrel that contains a lens or lens train. The optics of an ERS instrument are roughly similar to those of a 35 mm slide projector.

There are many types of ERS that are designed for the myriad applications found in the entertainment industry. ERS instruments come in all shapes and sizes. Each particular model of ERS has its own set of characteristics. Generally, ERS instruments are the most varied and utilized type of stage lighting instrument. ERS may also be referred to as Profile Spotlights (especially in Europe) because the beam can be shaped to the profile of an object.

Ellipsoidal reflectors are used for their strong, well-defined light and their versatility. Leko and Source Four are brand names which are often, but inaccurately, used to refer to any sort of ellipsoidal.

== Characteristics ==
Characteristics of a typical ellipsoidal lighting unit include:

- An ellipsoidal reflector
- An adjustable lens tube containing the lens or lens train. Adjusting the tube by pushing it further in or pulling it further out of the unit allows changes to the focus (softness or hardness) of the beam of light projected by the unit. This results from changing the distance between the reflector and the lens train. "Zoom" ERS instruments can vary the size of beam as well as the focus
- One or two Plano-Convex (PC for short) lenses within the lens tube to create the lens train. The Plano-Convex lenses, named for having one flat side and one convex (bowed out) side, have their convex sides facing each other within the tube. The distance between these lenses and the distance between them and the reflector determines how wide the output beam of light is
- A set of brackets on the end of the lens tube for the insertion of gel frames, a color changing unit or any variety of accessories. Most modern units include two slots that allow for combining different accessories
- A series of four shutters mounted at the internal focal point (the place where the varying angles of light coming off the reflector meet) of the unit. These allow for precise shaping and sizing of the unit's beam as lines. Additionally, an iris may be present to size the beam circularly.
- A slot in the body of the unit for the insertion of metal gobos to change the pattern of the light in most cases is present, this slot can also hold a glass gobo, dichroic colour roundel or an effects unit such as a gobo rotator or iris.

The lamps are loaded from the rear (in most cases), and either mounted axially, or radially with the base either up or down (the orientation is important when mounting the instrument as using the light upside down will shorten lamp life) at a 45-degree angle or sometimes at a 90-degree angle. The filament of the lamp is at one focal point of the ellipsoidal reflector and the gate with the shutters and gobo are at the other focal point.

== Field angle ==
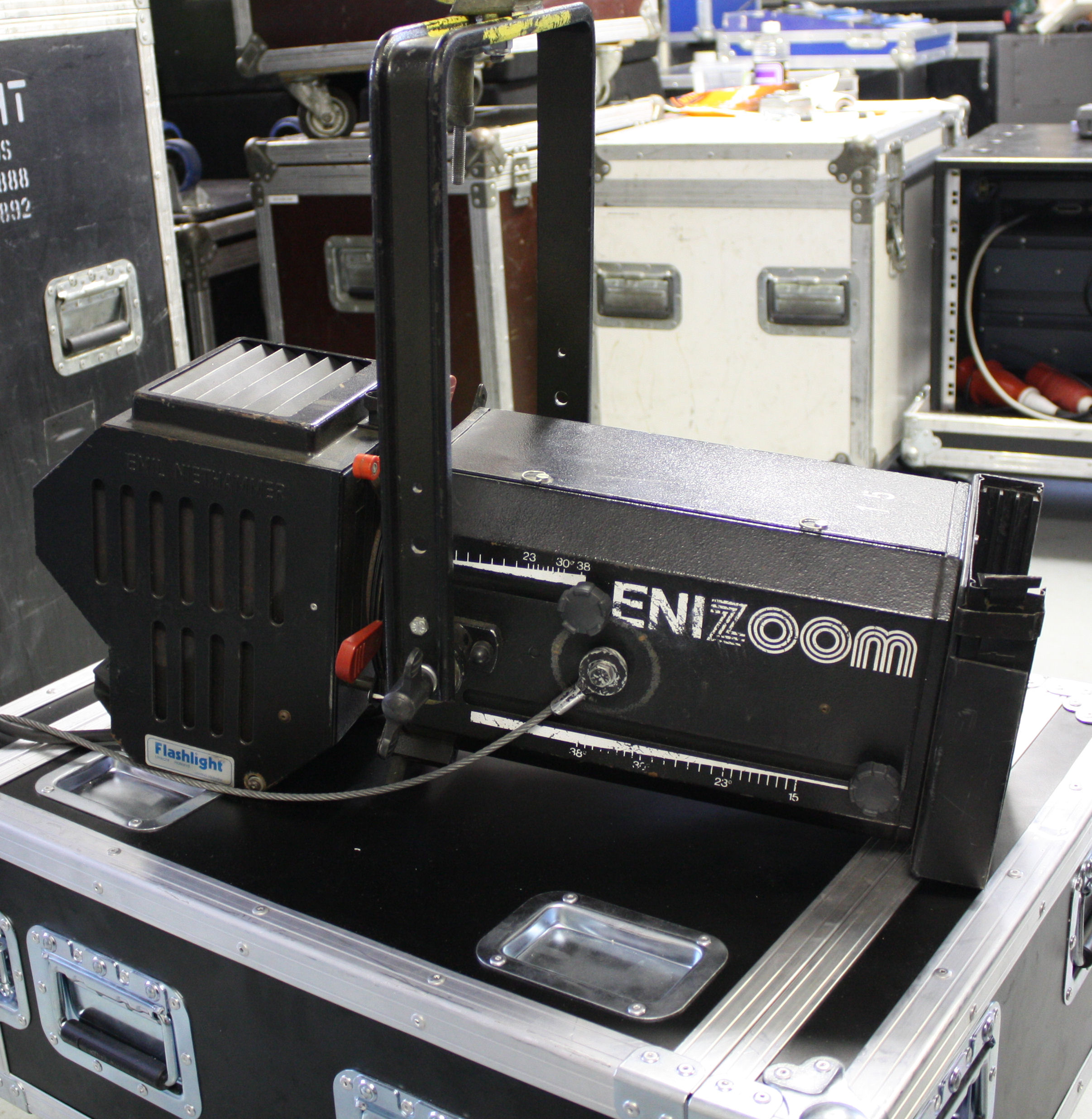
Niethammer Enizoom ERS with variable focus (Zoom).

Ellipsoidals are supplied with a certain size lens or lenses that determines the field angle, anywhere from five to ninety degrees. Field angle is the angle of the beam of light where it reaches 10% of the intensity of the center of the beam. Most manufacturers now use field angle to indicate the fixture's spread typically in this series (5°, 10°, 19°, 26°, 36°, 50°, 75°, 90°). Older fixtures are described by the width of the lens x focal length of the instrument. For example, a 6x9 ellipsoidal would have a 6" diameter lens and a focal length of 9". 6x9 Instruments have a field angle of approximately 37°. 6x12 instruments have a field angle of approximately 27°. As the field angle narrows, the instrument can be used further from the stage. Variable focus (zoom) instruments with two lenses that move in and out from the lamp housing are also available, allowing the user to manually adjust to the desired focal length within a certain range. Ellipsoidals can be used for any job but their primary function is to illuminate a specific proximity. They are the common use for spotlights as they can give a small sharp circle. It has an ellipsoidal reflector behind the lamp to reflect the light in the direction required. They have brackets on the end to attach gels and barn doors. Barn doors do the same as the shutters but give a softer edge.

== Updates to the design ==
Cutaway drawing of a Selecon Pacific Zoomspot showing how the mirror and heat sink remove heat from the beam of light

The Electronic Theatre Controls Source Four, released in 1992, updated the traditional ERS design. The company took advantage of advances in lamp and reflector technology to increase luminous output with less wattage. The Source Four name comes from the improved lamp design utilizing four filament elements.

Other improvements included the use of a single lens in most lens trains, making the unit lighter and more efficient in regards to light output, and a rotating barrel containing lens tube assembly, shutters, and accessory slot to allow increased precision in use of the shutters and/or more easily registering gobos.

Since the release of the Source Four, other lighting manufacturers have since revised their products to compete in the market share alongside the ETC. The Selecon Pacific, an L-shaped ERS, has an irregular shape due to an integrated dichroic cold mirror, which effectively splits the visible wavelengths of the light beam from the infrared, allowing the heat to be drawn off by a heat sink and away from the instrument. This keeps the beam of the fixture cool allowing for the use of plastic gobos. The beam also improves shutter, gobo and color gel life, and can improve the temperature on stage. Altman Lighting released their Shakespeare line of units in 1994 as a response to the Source Four. One improvement over the Source Four is a wider range of adjustment in regards to rotation of the barrel assembly. The patents for some components in this unit have been licensed from ETC.

In 2004 ADB introduced WARP Profile - In this ellipsoidal profile spot conventional shutters have been replaced by four integrated blades controlled by a series of rings, each with 360⁰ endless rotation capability. Focus and Zoom settings are also controlled by a set of dedicated rings. The ring controls leave the exterior of the WARP spotlight with no protruding handles or levers. The design of the WARP allows the standard trunion arms to be replaced with a motorised yoke. This yoke links also into the ring controls providing automation of all other functions—focus and zoom, shutter insertion / rotation and gobo rotation. The motorised unit is without any forced ventilation (fans) and completely silent, making the unit ideal for acoustic critical applications (TV studios, concert halls et al.)

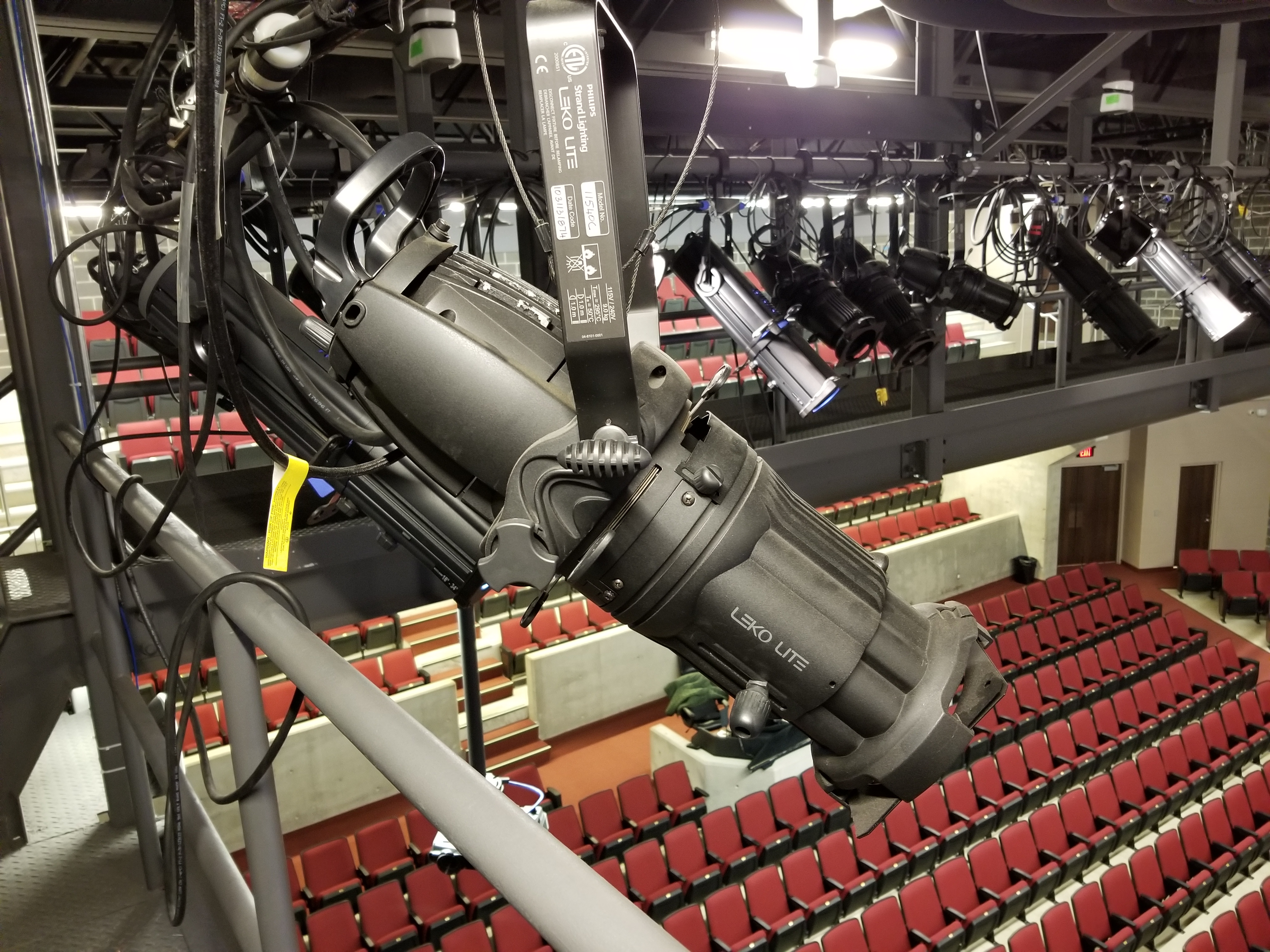
A Strand Leko Lite

Most recently, Philips Strand Lighting released their Lekolite ERS. Improvements in this fixture include improved optics, 360-degree barrel rotation, a specialized yoke design allowing for rapid tool-free short yoking, a quick change lamp and improved heat dissipation technology and design integration.

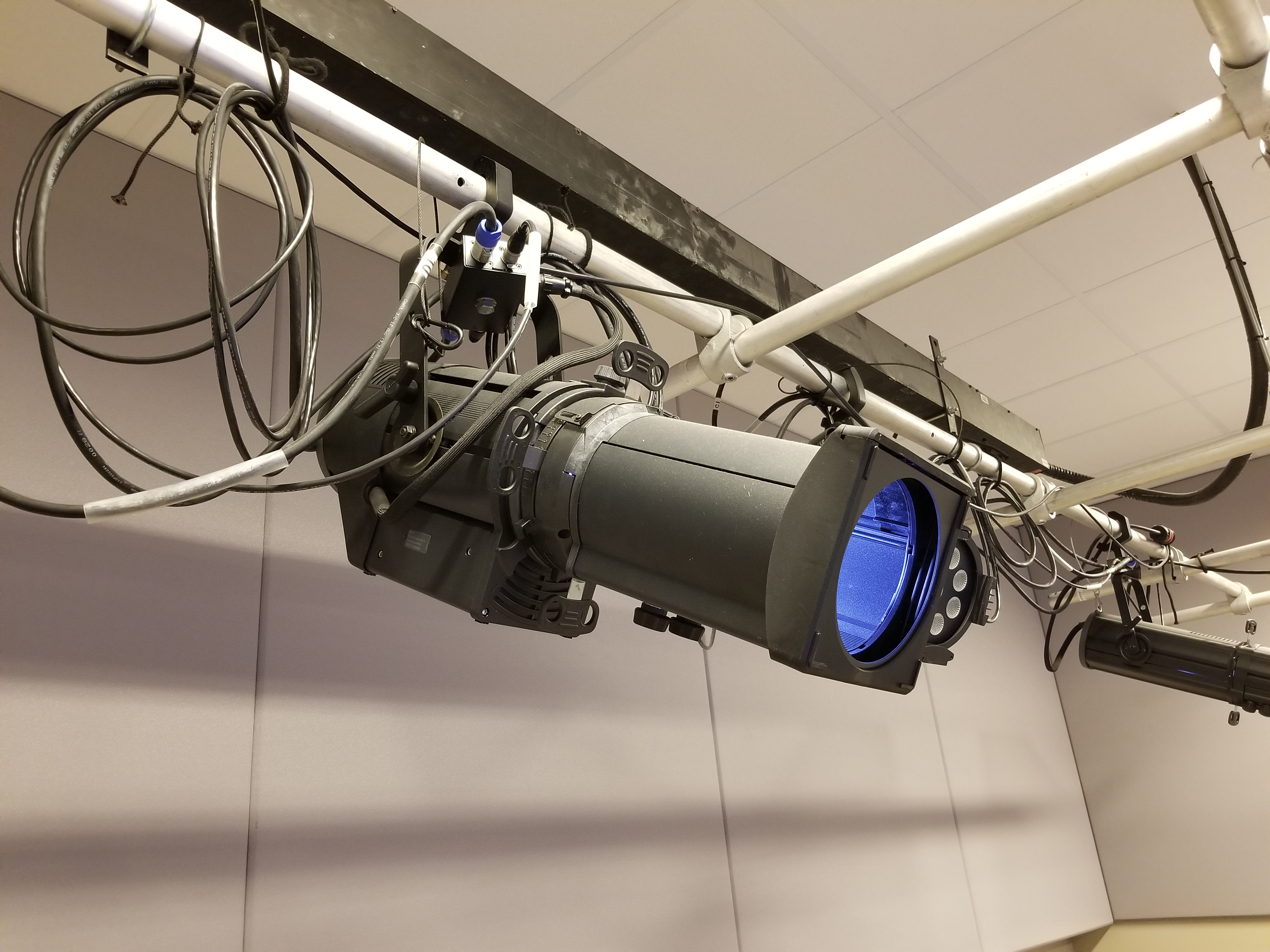
Selecon PLPROFILE4 MK2 LED ellipsoidal reflector spotlight

In 2011 the LED technology has also finally reached the ERS applications, with several major lighting manufacturer companies worldwide introducing an energy saving, no maintenance, modern version of the standard ETC Source Four. On April 6, 2011, the Italian manufacturer Coemar launched Reflection LEDko at PLASA (the ProLight+Sound Association fair, one of the main tradeshows of the lighting industry, held annually in Frankfurt, Germany), a development which could lead to an average power consumption saving of 85 percent.

== See also ==
- Stage lighting
- Stage lighting instrument
- Lighting designer
