= Eye protection =

Protective gear for the eyes

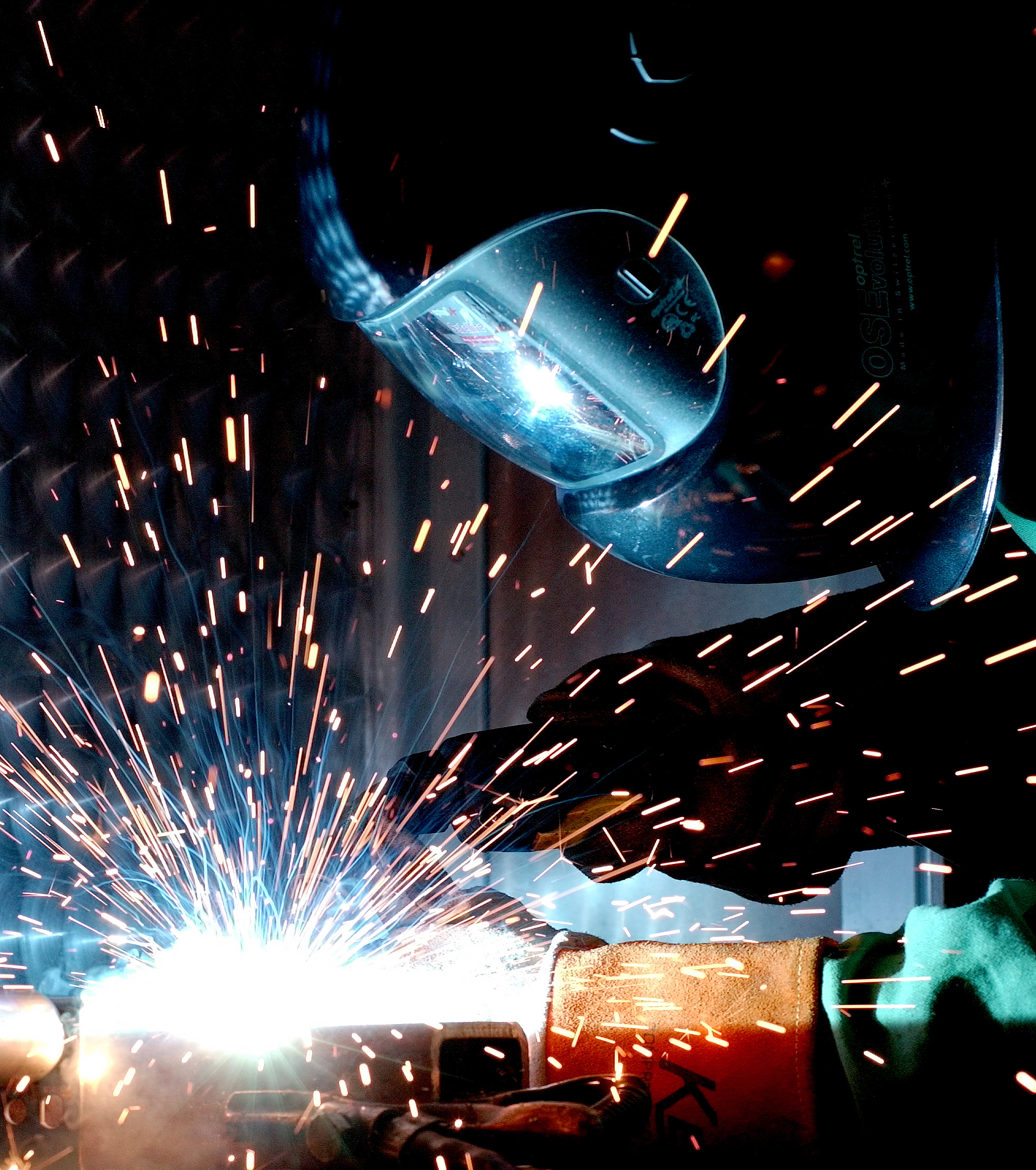
An airman using a welding mask. Failing to use proper eye protection when welding may lead to blindness.

Eye protection is protective gear for the eyes, and sometimes face, designed to reduce the risk of injury. Examples of risks requiring eye protection can include: impact from particles or debris, light or radiation, wind blast, heat, sea spray or impact from some type of ball or puck used in sports.

Eye protection are typically separated into categories based on the style of eye wear and the hazard they are designed to reduce. There categories include: spectacles with side protection; goggles; welding helmet; welding hand shields; non-rigid helmets (hoods); face shield; and respirator face pieces.

== Styles ==
=== Spectacles ===
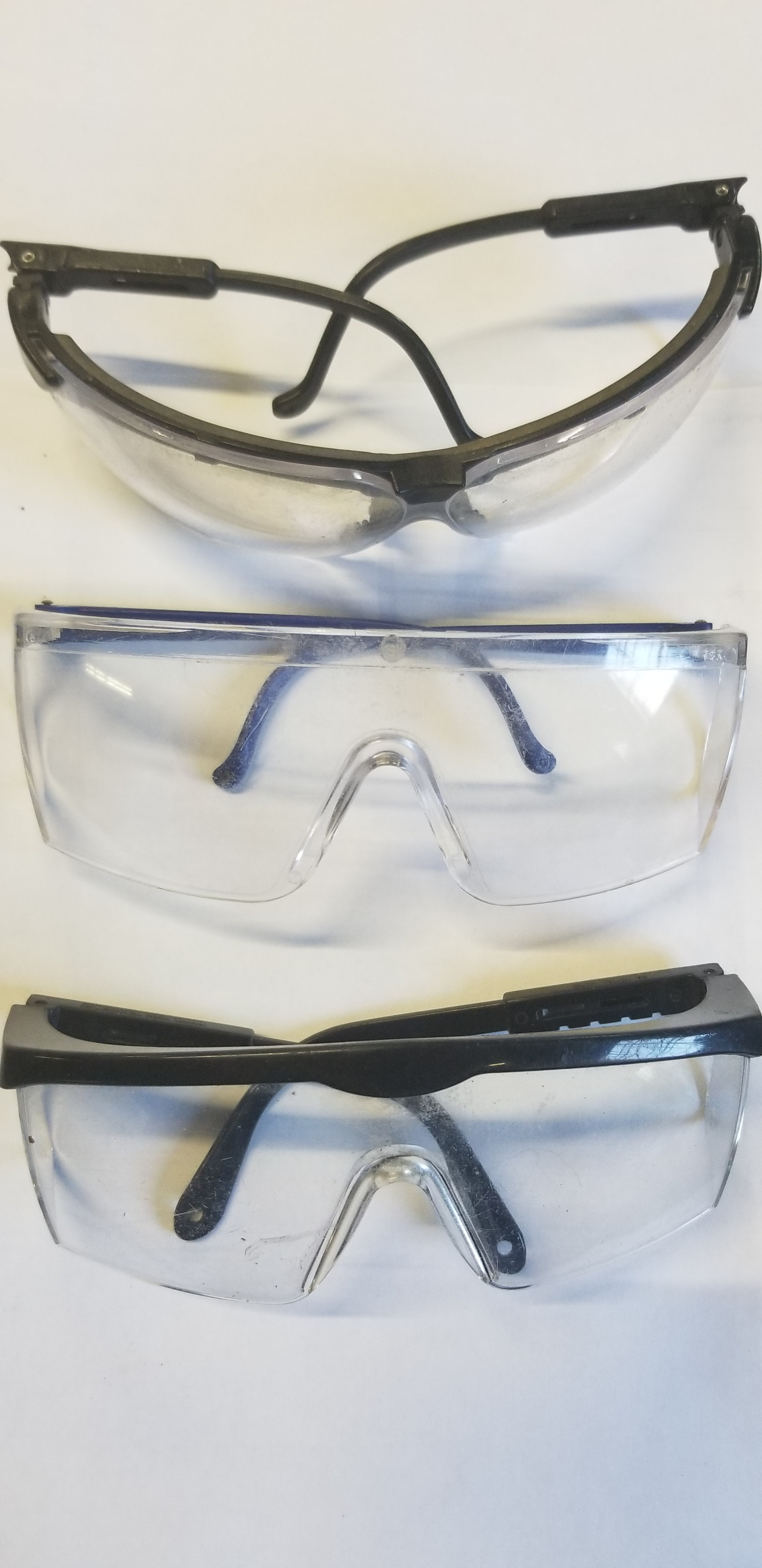
Examples of different styles of safety glasses

Safety glasses or spectacles, although often used as a catch-all term for all types of eye protection, specifically refers to protective equipment that closely resembles common eye wear. To meet most national standards, spectacles must include side shields to reduce the ability of debris to get behind the lenses from the side. Safety glasses can often mount insert frames to mount prescription corrective lenses for users with suboptimal vision. Such insert frames are mounted behind the protective lens. In some applications, regular eye wear, if manufactured from high-impact materials, can be worn with removable side shields. Oversized spectacles are also manufactured, designed to sit over the user's normal eye wear.

=== Goggles ===
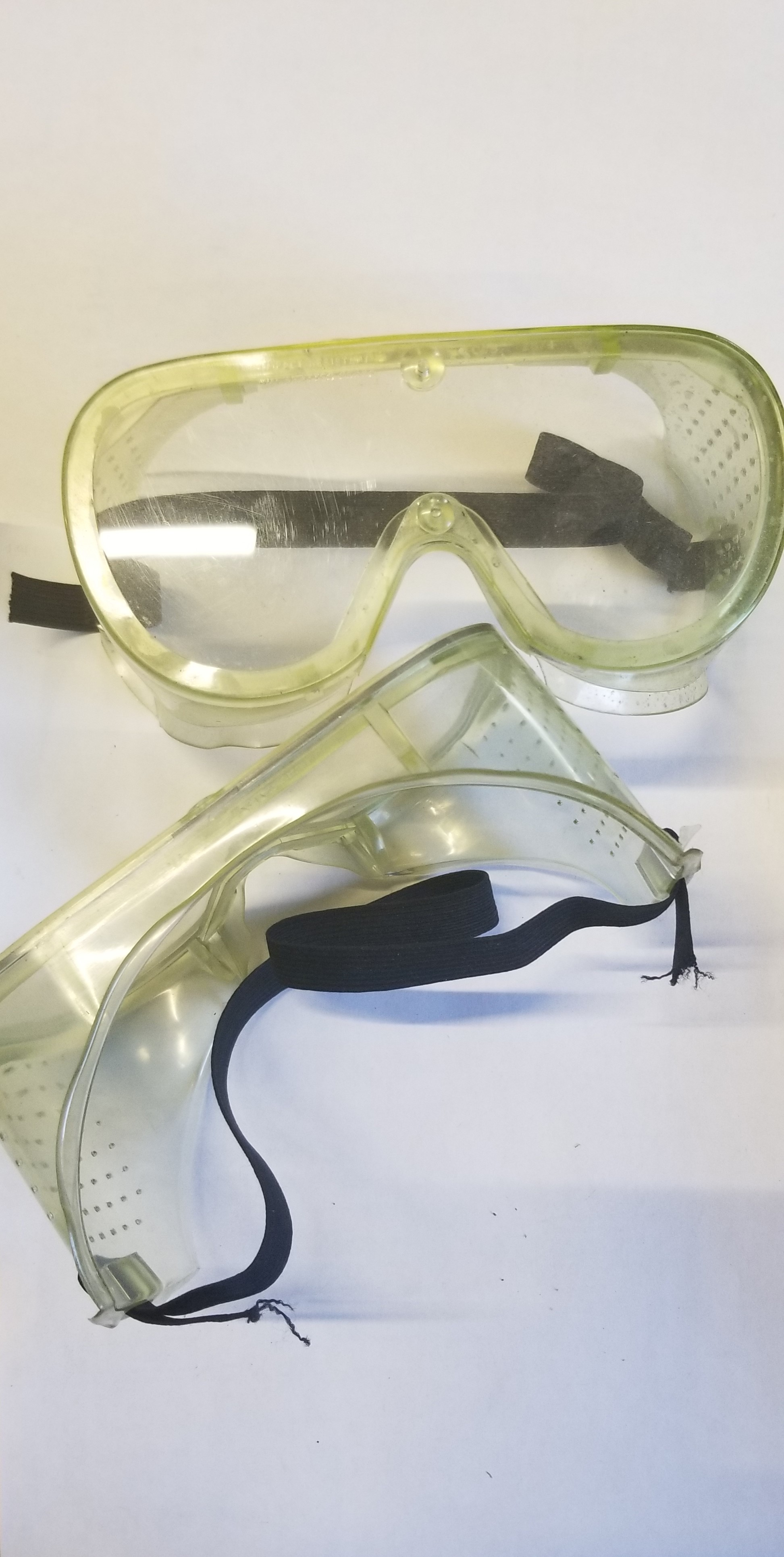
Cover style safety goggles

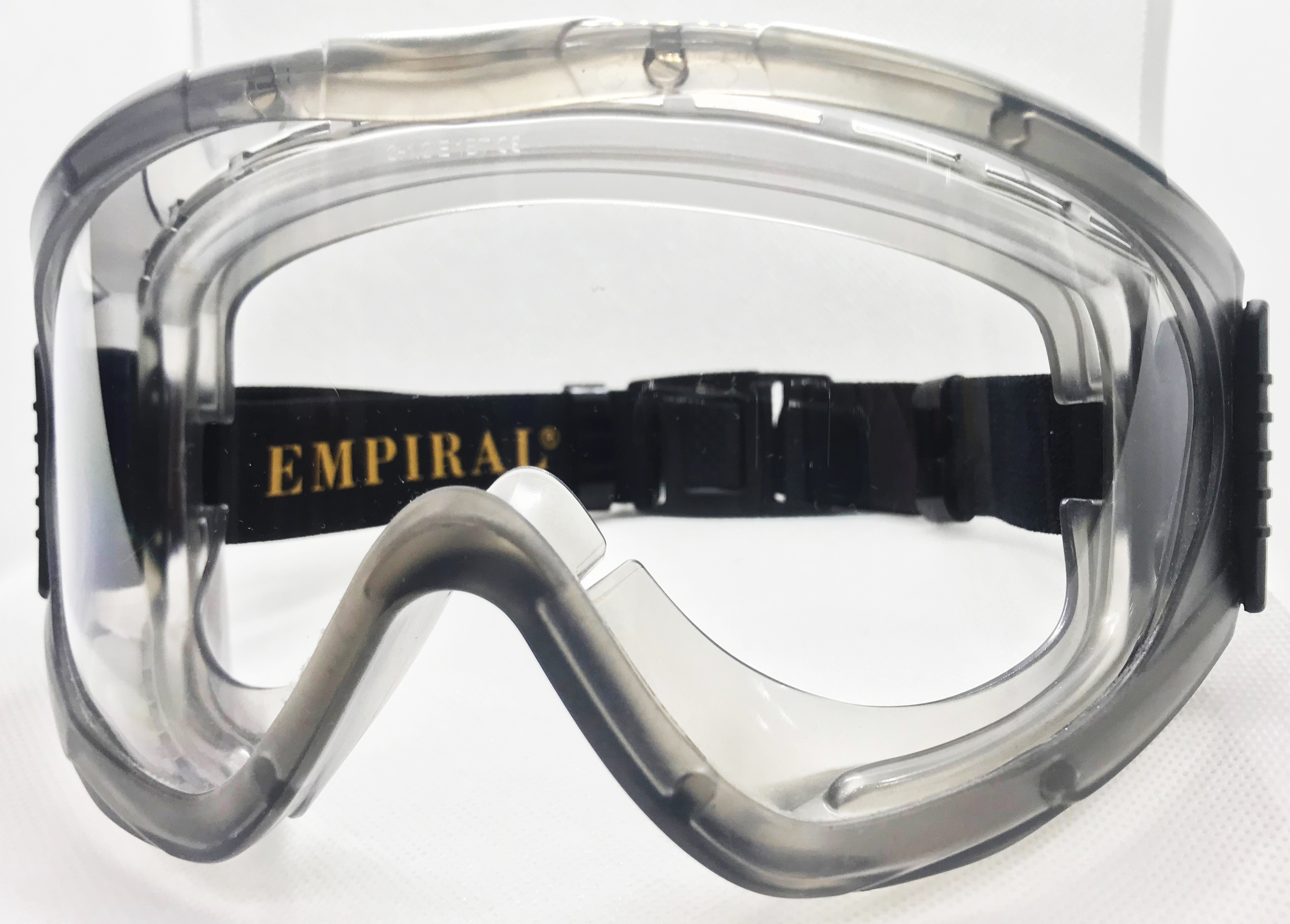
Empiral Vision grey goggles

Goggles are forms of protective eyewear that enclose the eye area in order to prevent particulates, infectious fluids, or chemicals from striking the eyes. Goggles come in two styles, eyecup goggles, and cover goggles. Eyecup goggles completely cover the eye socket to give all-round protection. They have adjustable or elasticized headbands and often are equipped with ventilation ports to allow air in and prevent fogging. For example, swimming goggles protect the eyes from salt or chlorine. Cover goggles are designed to be worn over eye wear. Like eyecup goggles, they have adjustable or elasticized headbands and are equipped with direct or indirect ventilation ports to allow air in and prevent fogging. While both models keep out large particles, indirect-vented goggles are better at keeping out liquids and dusts.

=== Welding helmets and shields ===
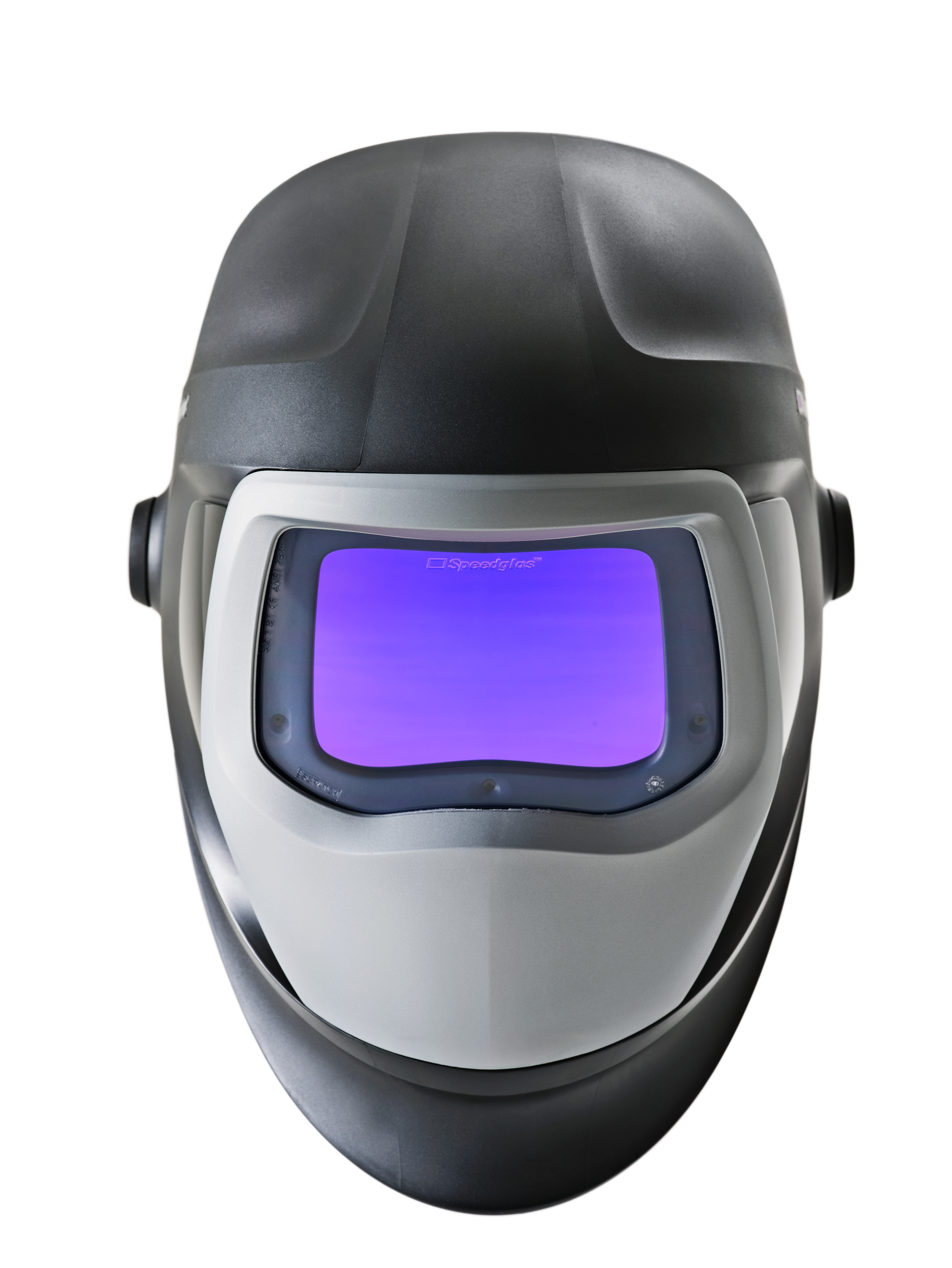
Speedglas welding helmet

A welding helmet is a type of headgear used when performing certain types of welding to protect the eyes, face and neck from flash burn, ultraviolet light, sparks, infrared light, and heat. A welding hand shield is a metal plate containing the same protective lens as a welding helmet with a handle on the bottom, intended to be held up in front of the face while working.

=== Hoods ===
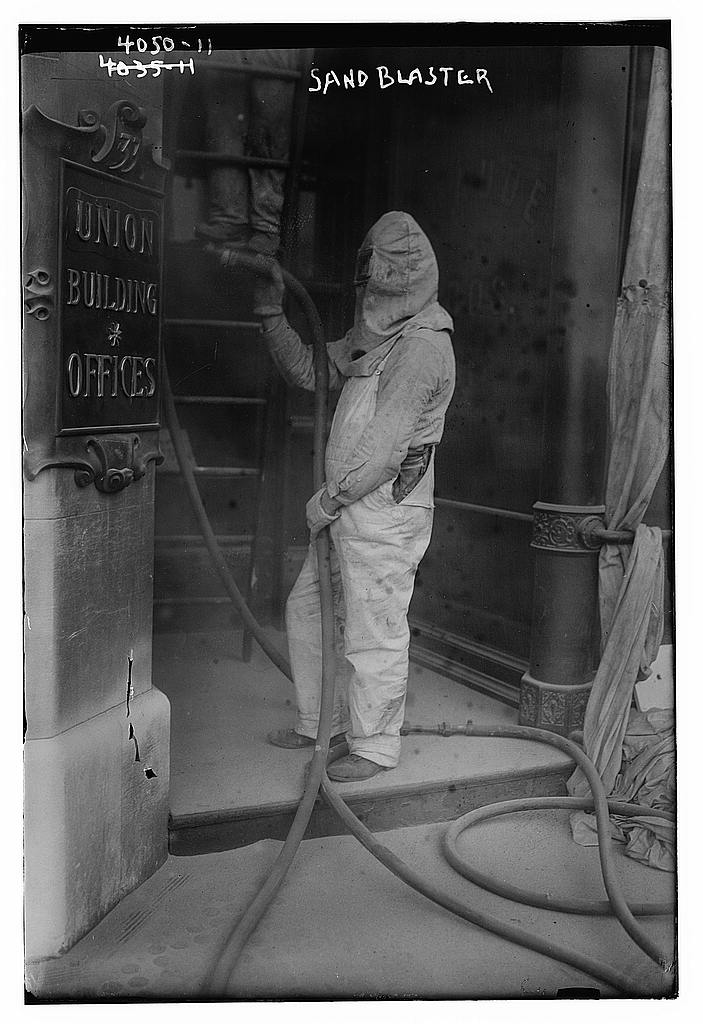
Sandblasting in a protective hood

Hoods (or non-rigid helmets) come with impact-resistant windows usually made of plastic or similar material. An air-supply system may also be incorporated. Hoods are made of non-rigid material for use in confined spaces and of collapsible construction for convenience in carrying and storing.

=== Face shields ===
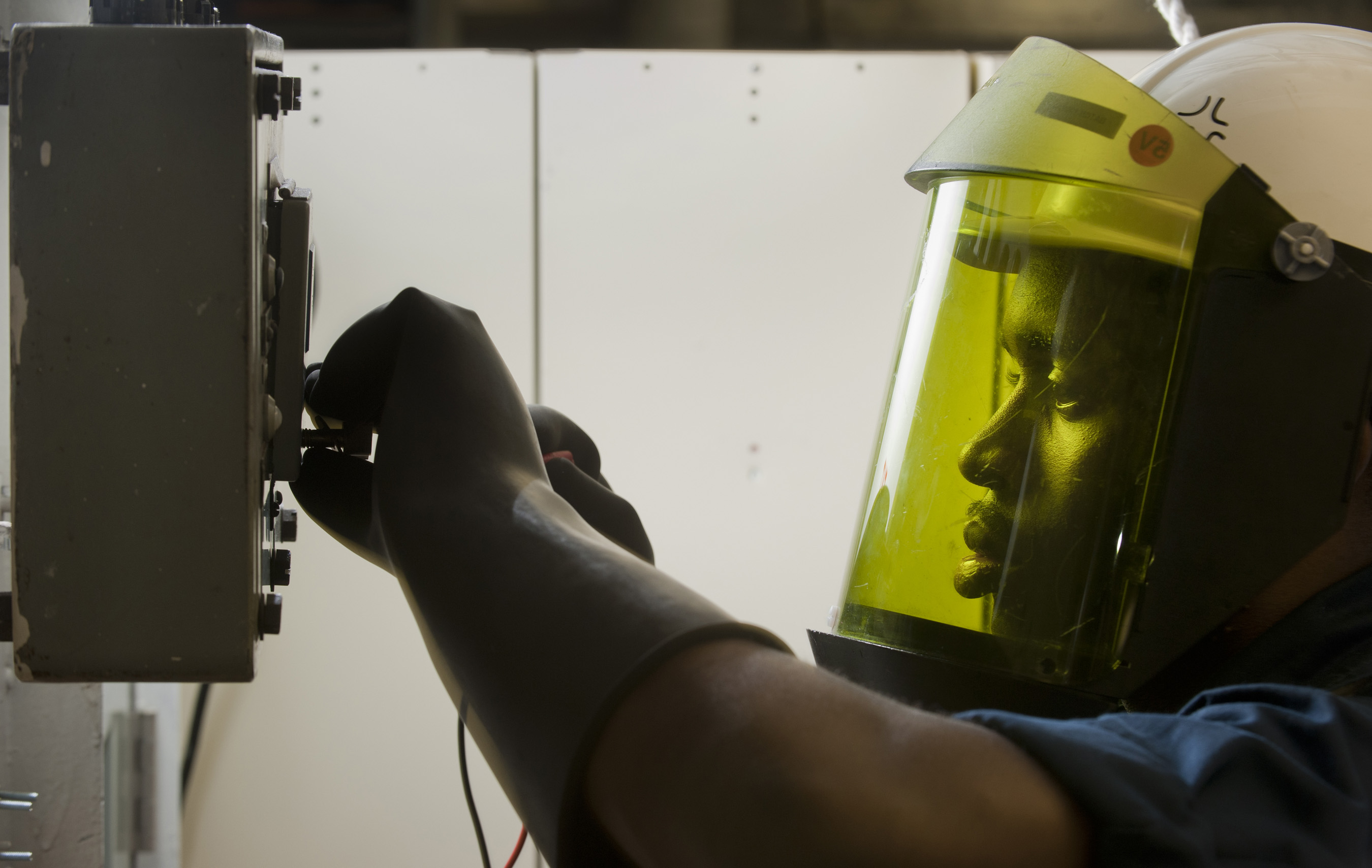
An Electrician's Mate wearing a face shield while checking for bad fuses

A face shield is a device used to protect wearer's entire face (or part of it) from hazards such as impact, splash, heat, or glare. With face shields, as with welding helmets and hand shields, the user is periodically lifting and lowering the visor. To protect the eyes when the visor is lifted, spectacles should be worn underneath.

=== Respirator face pieces ===
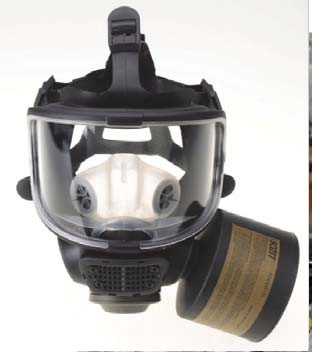
Full face shield respirator

A respirator is a device designed to protect the wearer from inhaling particulate matter, including airborne microorganisms, fumes, vapours and gases.

== Protection categories ==
=== Flying objects ===
Insects like flies, bees, and wasps can fly at high speeds and come into contact with a person's eyes. Their wings or stingers can cause irritation or even scratch the cornea, which can be painful and potentially cause long-term damage.

Small projectiles and fragments generated from processes like grinding, machining, or tool or part breakage under strain (e.g., when torque is applied with hand tools, power tools, impact wrenches, or cheater bars) can have the potential to penetrate some types of protective eye-wear. In the United States the ANSI/ISEA Z87.1-2020 standard is used to certify protective eye-wear which is capable of protecting from these hazards.

=== Flying particles, dust, and wind ===
Debris such as dust, dirt, and small rocks can be picked up by the wind and fly into one's eyes. This can cause discomfort and potentially lead to a corneal abrasion or infection.

=== UV radiation ===
Ultraviolet (UV) radiation from the sun can also harm a person's eyes. Prolonged exposure to UV rays can cause cataracts, macular degeneration, and other eye conditions that can lead to vision loss.

=== Acid splash; chemical burns ===
A large percentage of eye injuries are caused by direct contact with chemicals. These injuries often result from an inappropriate choice of personal protective equipment that allows a chemical substance to enter from around or under protective eye equipment. Serious and irreversible damage can occur when chemical substances contact the eyes in the form of splash, mists, vapors, or fumes. When working with or around chemicals, it is important to know the location of emergency eyewash stations and how to access them with restricted vision.

When fitted and worn correctly, goggles protect your eyes from hazardous substances. A face shield may be required in areas where workers are exposed to severe chemical hazards.

Personal protective equipment devices for chemical hazards:

- Safety goggles: Primary protectors intended to shield the eyes against liquid or chemical splash, irritating mists, vapors, and fumes.
- Face shields: Secondary protectors intended to protect the entire face against exposure to chemical hazards.

=== Glare or stray light ===
The human eye is sensitive to intense light because it damages the retina and can even blind the individual. There are many different types of eye protection against light suited for different applications. The most common forms of eye protection against light are sunglasses. These primarily protect against UV light from the sun and help increase visibility in bright conditions. They often tend to be fashionable as well as practical.

=== Injurious optical radiation (Moderate) ===
Laser protection eyewear will filter out a particular (or small range of) wavelength(s), customized to the laser being viewed. Laser protection eye wear is particularly important because of the extremely high intensity of laser light.

=== Injurious optical radiation (Severe) ===
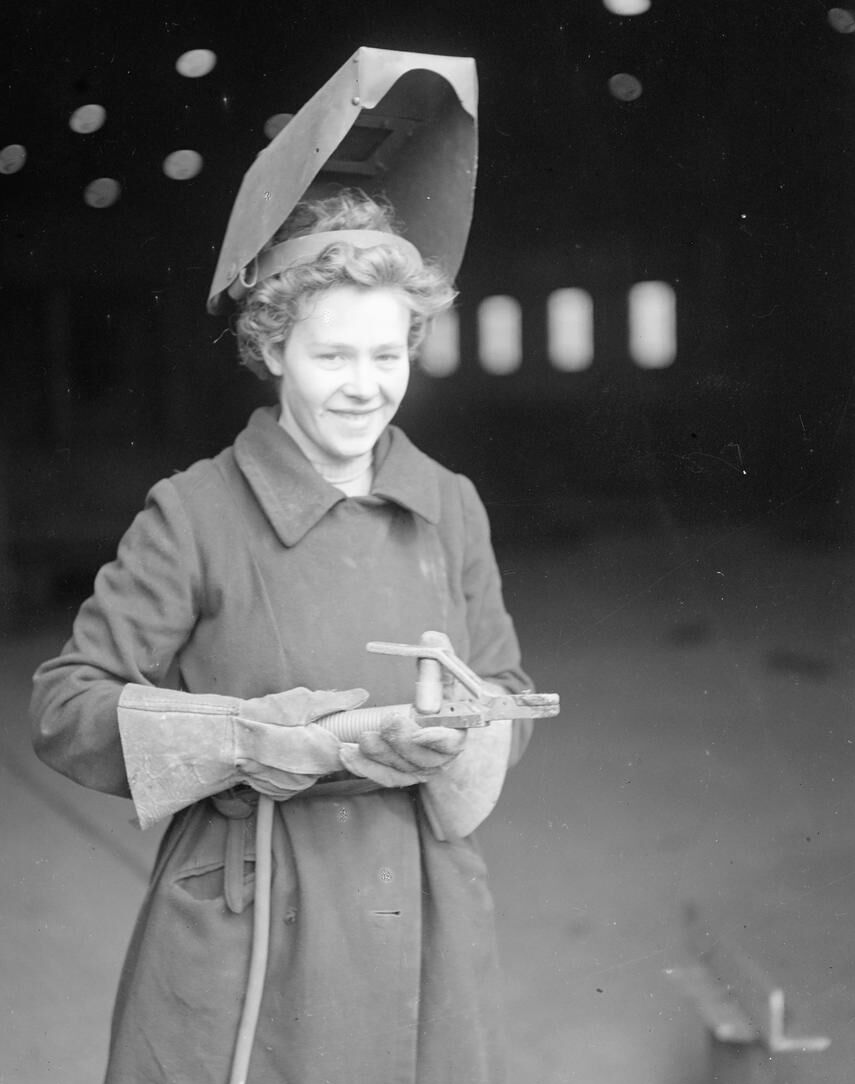
A welder with a raised welding helmet and heavy protective gloves (1943)

Welding glass protects against glare and flying sparks. It is a more extreme implementation of the same idea as sunglasses, suited to the more intense light generated during welding. Arc welding goggles must be much darker than blowtorch goggles. Shades 12, 13, and 14 welding glass must be used to stare directly at the sun or a solar eclipse. These higher index shades are suitable for arc welding and therefore are suitable for solar viewing. Sunglasses will not provide sufficient protection.

== Other protection ==
- Eye protectors used in sports like orienteering and cycling to protect eyes from insects, dust and wind blast.
- Infection control glasses
- Eye shields used in External beam radiotherapy to shield sensitive parts of the eye from ionizing radiation

== Helmets and visors ==
Some helmets and visors also protect the eyes:

- Armor visors were used in conjunction with some Medieval war helmets to protect the eyes from impact.
- Batting helmet with full face coverage is used by the catcher in baseball and softball games to protect the eyes and face from impact.
- Eyeshield is a piece of football equipment which attaches to a player's helmet to protect the eyes from impact.
- Fighter pilot helmet includes a visor for protection from the sun and from wind blast in case of an ejection from the aircraft.
- Some firefighter's helmets have visors which protect the eyes from infrared rays and the radiant heat of fire as well as from impact.
- A green eyeshade is a kind of visor designed to protect the wearer from eye strain.
- Hockey helmets have visors, shields, cages and masks to protect the eyes and face from impact.
- Hurling helmets protect the eyes from the ball and from near contact with other players.
- Lacrosse helmets used in men's lacrosse have a cage to protect the face and eyes from impact.
- Lifeboatman's helmet has a transparent visor to keep sea spray out of the eyes.
- Motorcycle helmets and Bicycle helmets have face shields that protects the eyes against wind blast, dust, insects and impact in the event of a crash.
- Racing helmets also have face shields (narrower than motorcycle helmets) to protect against fire and impact.
- Riot protection helmets have visors to protect the eyes and face from projectiles and impact.
- Safety helmets, also called hard hats, used by chainsaw operators and construction workers often have visors to protect the eyes from impact.
- Space suit helmets have gold-impregnated face shields to protect astronauts from the direct rays of the sun.

== Gallery ==
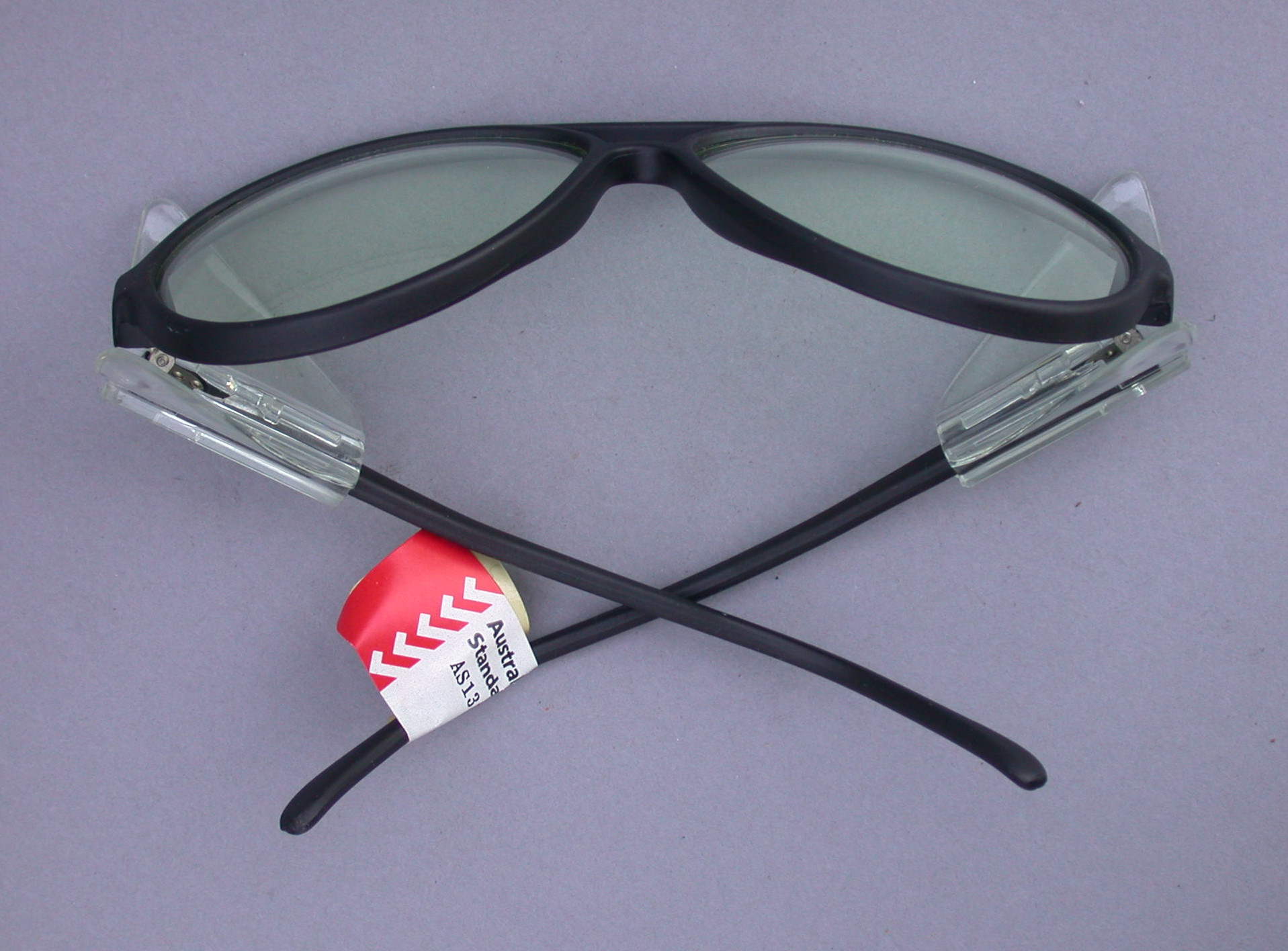
Safety glasses

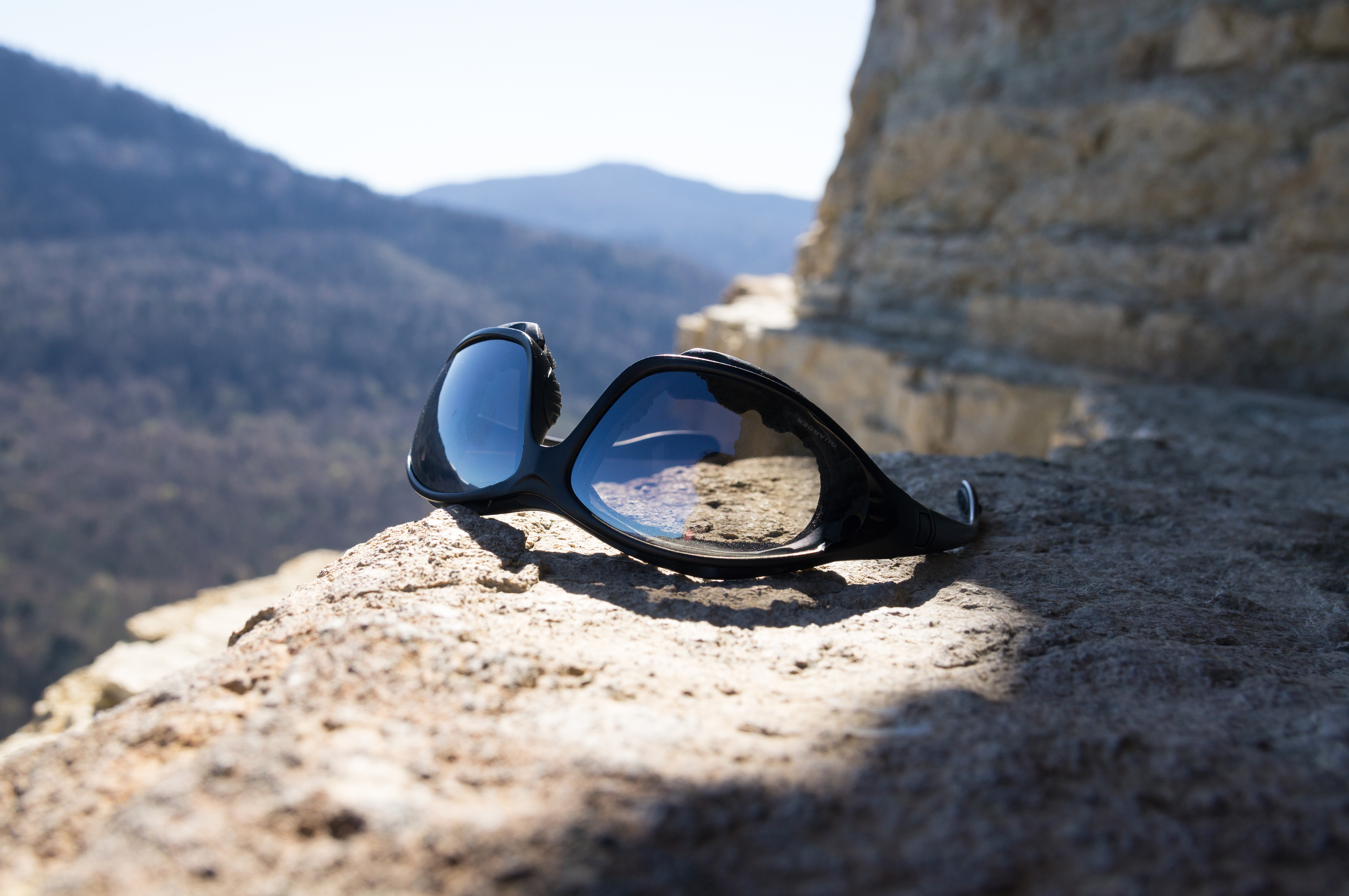
Sunglasses

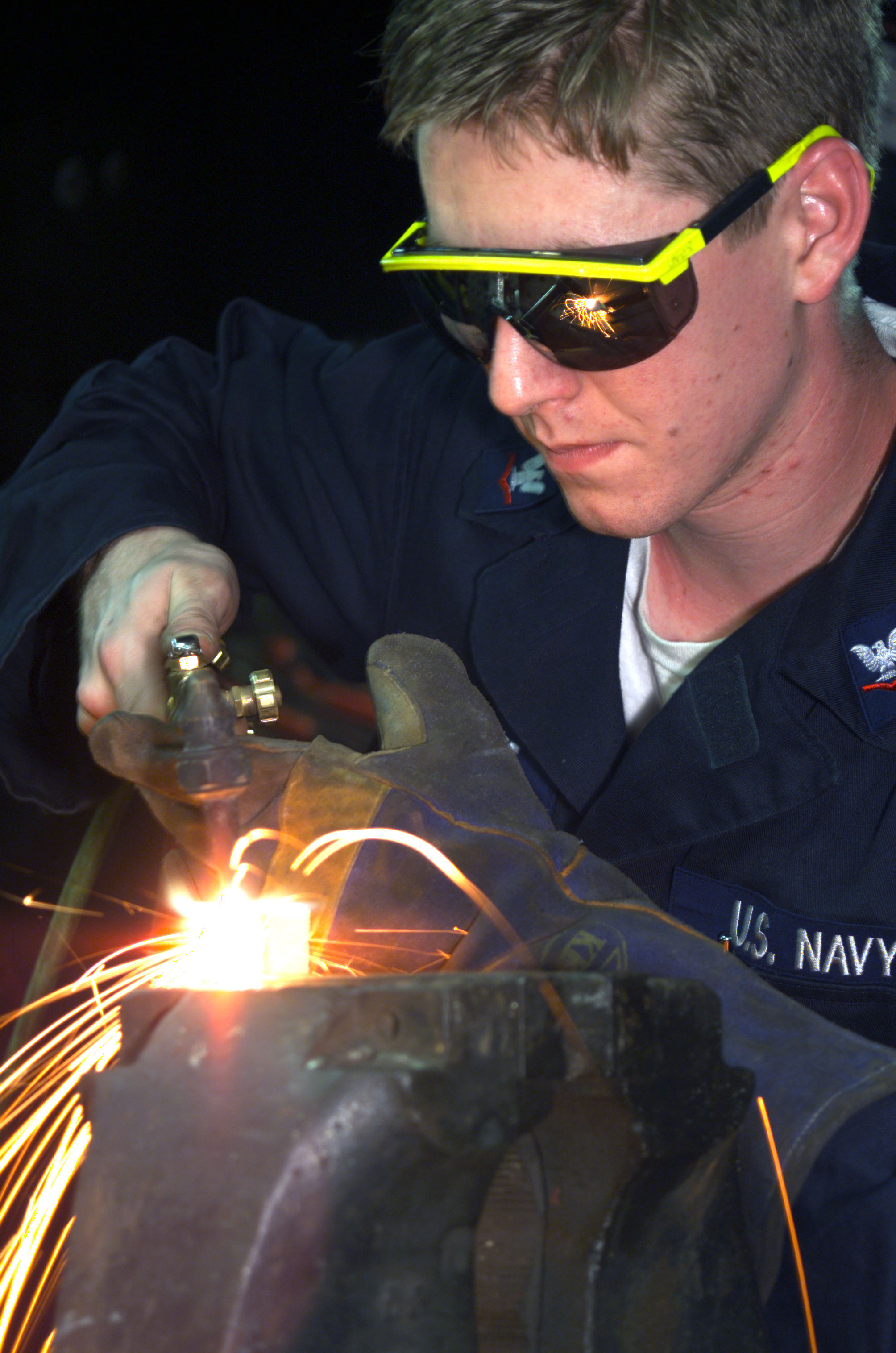
A U.S. Navy sailor using welding glasses

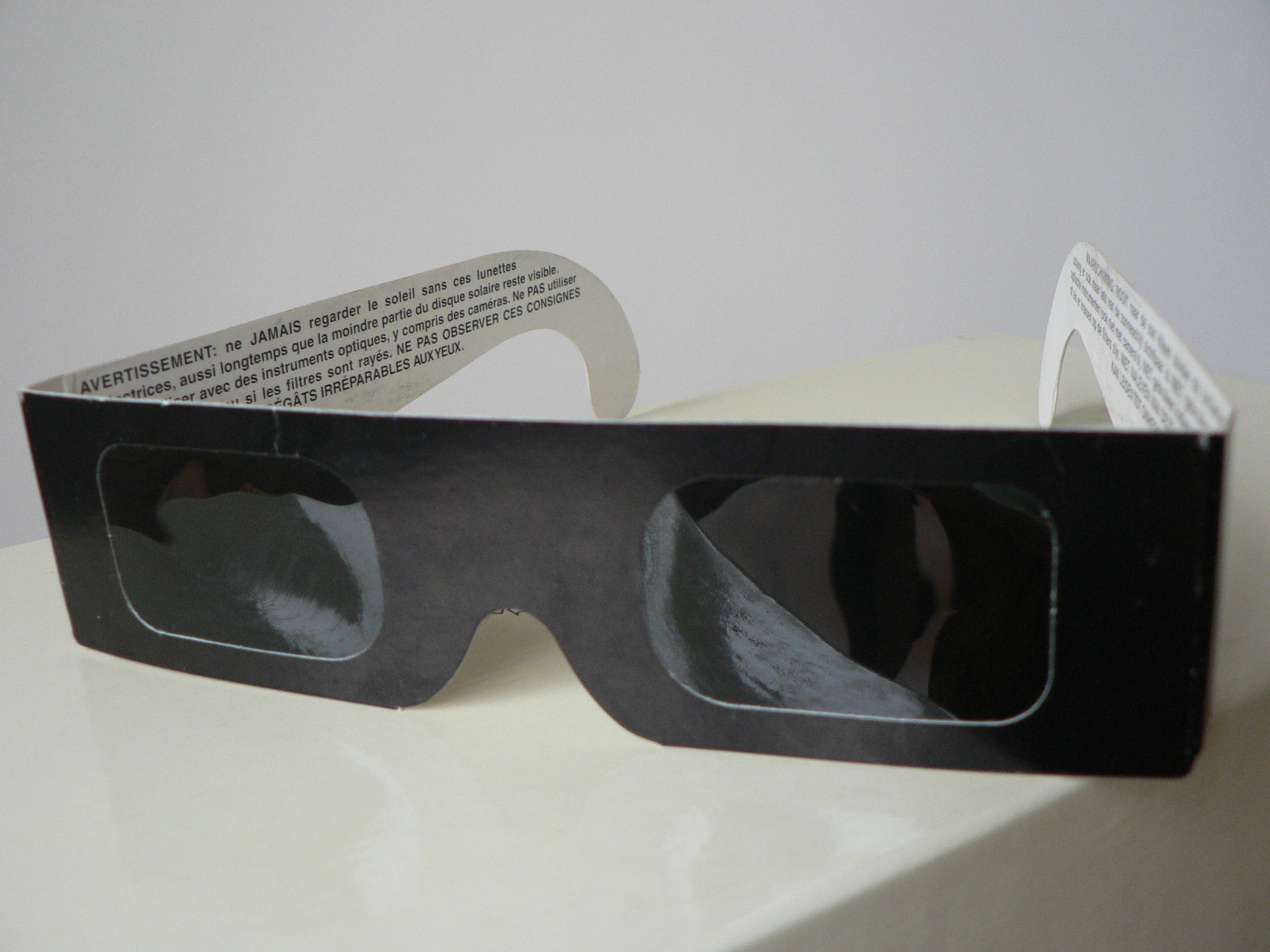
Solar eclipse glasses

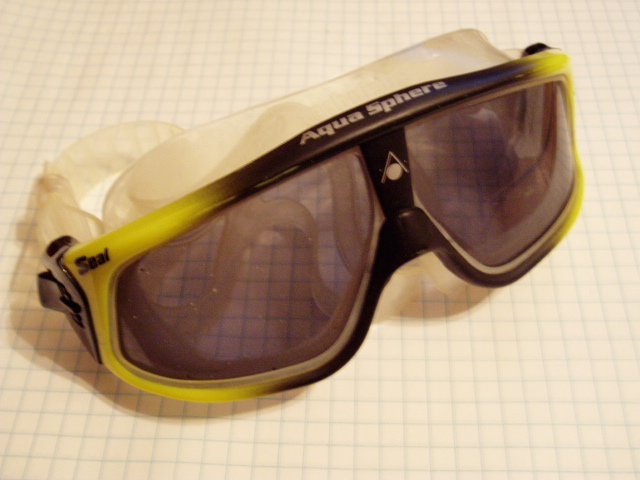
Swim goggles

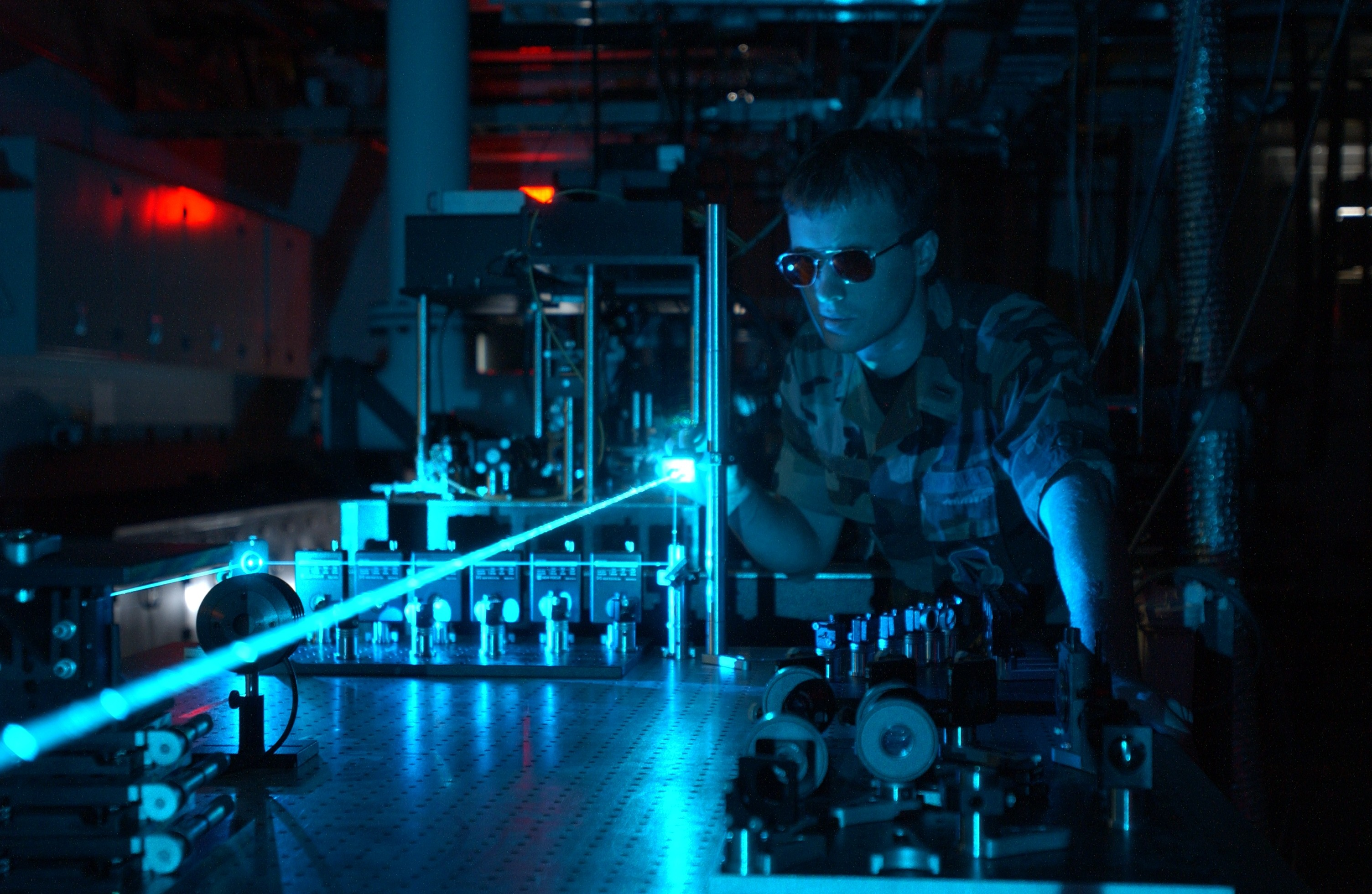
A U.S. military scientist using laser protection eyewear

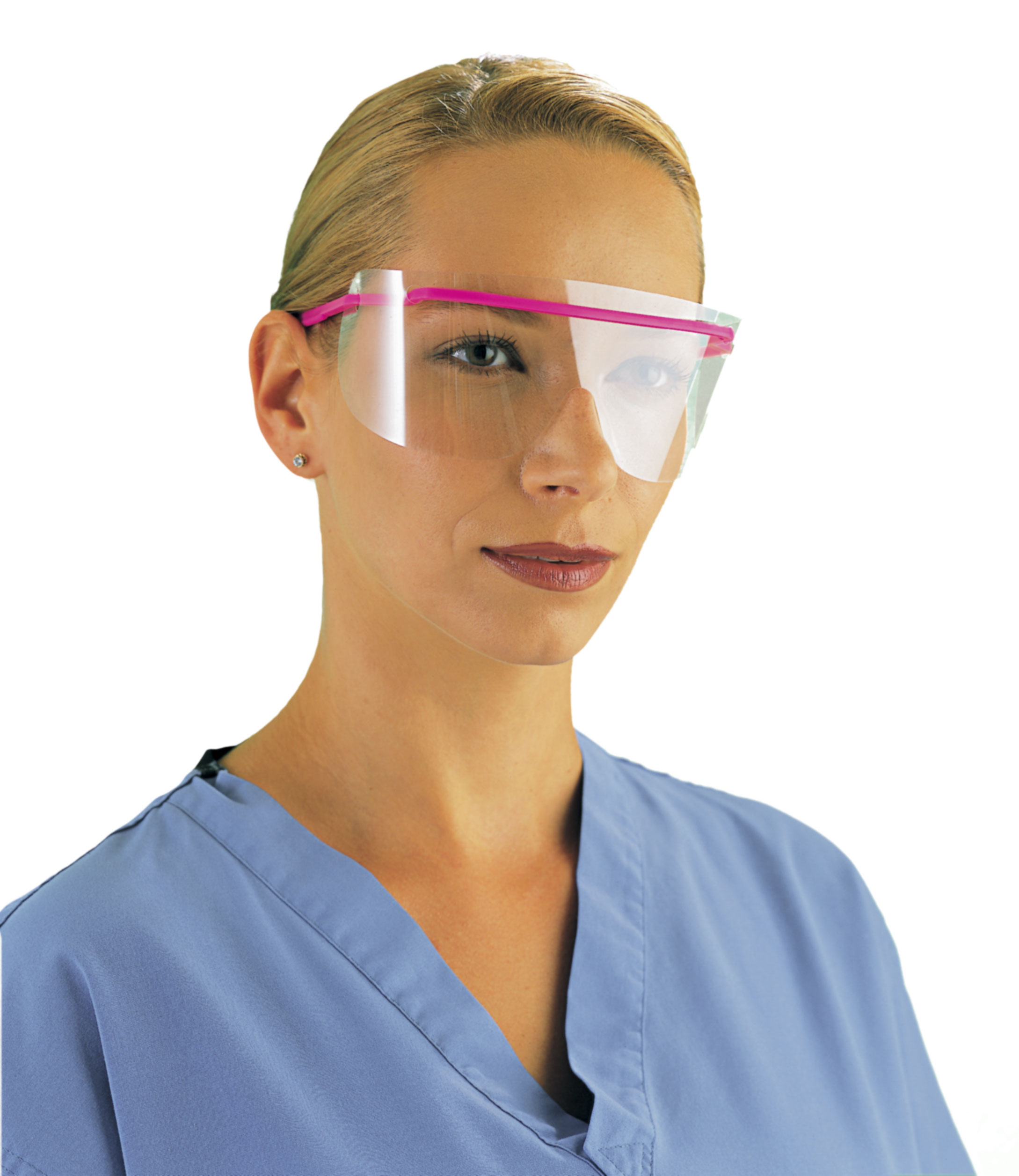
Infection control eye protection

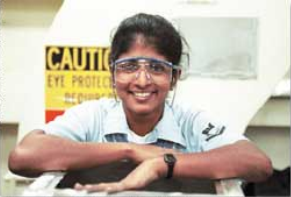
U.S. Navy sailor wearing eye protection in the late 1990s

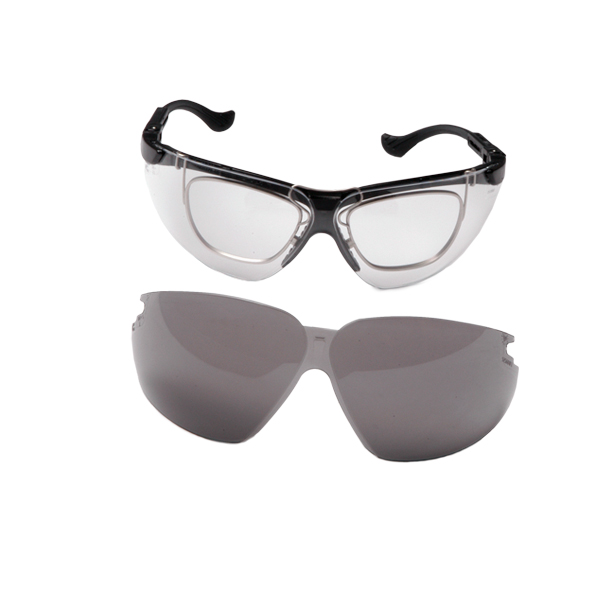
U.S. Military Combat Eye Protection (MCEP) glasses with an inserted optional prescription lens carrier.

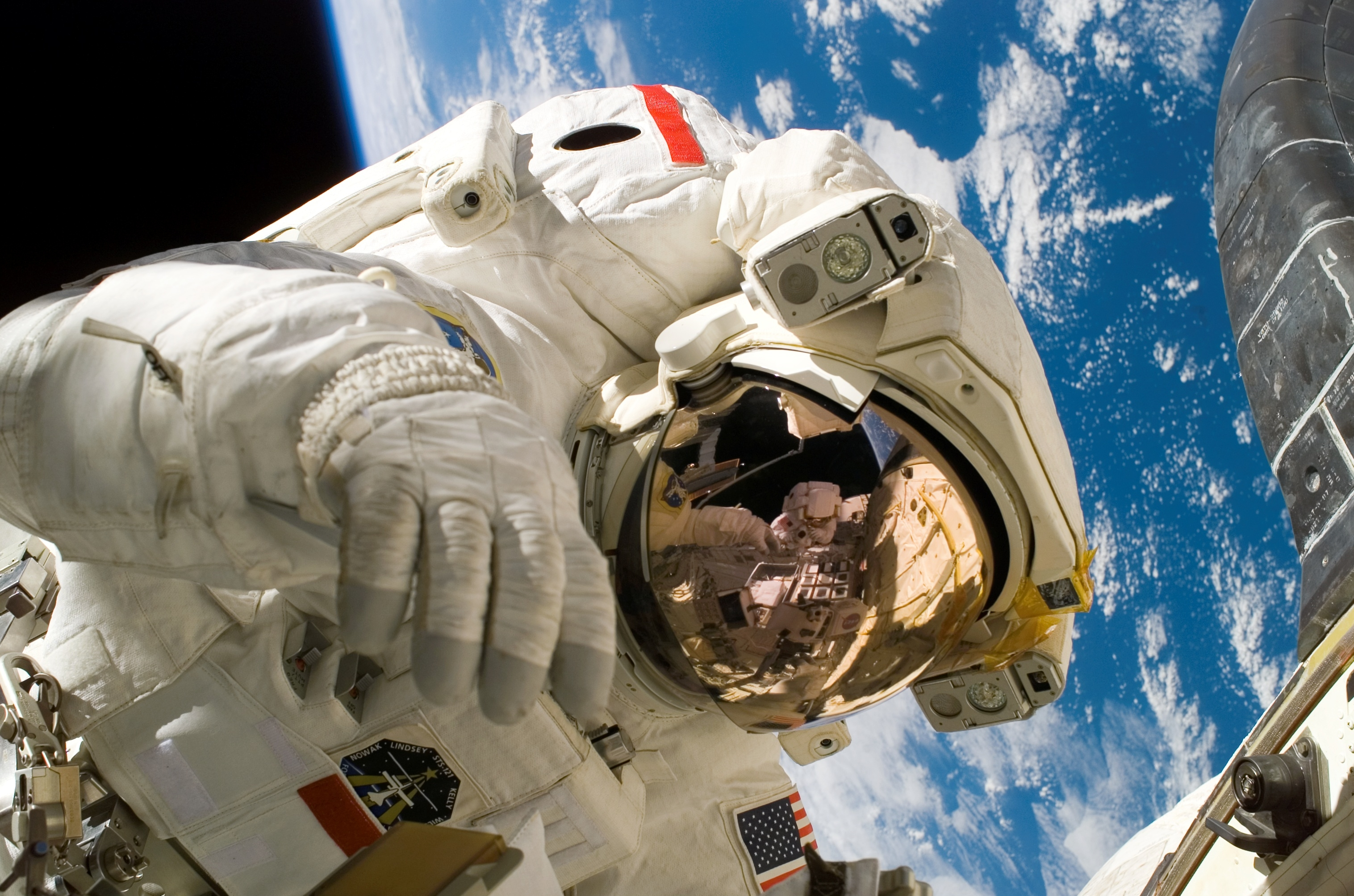
The gold-impregnated faceshield of spacesuits protects astronauts from direct Sun rays.

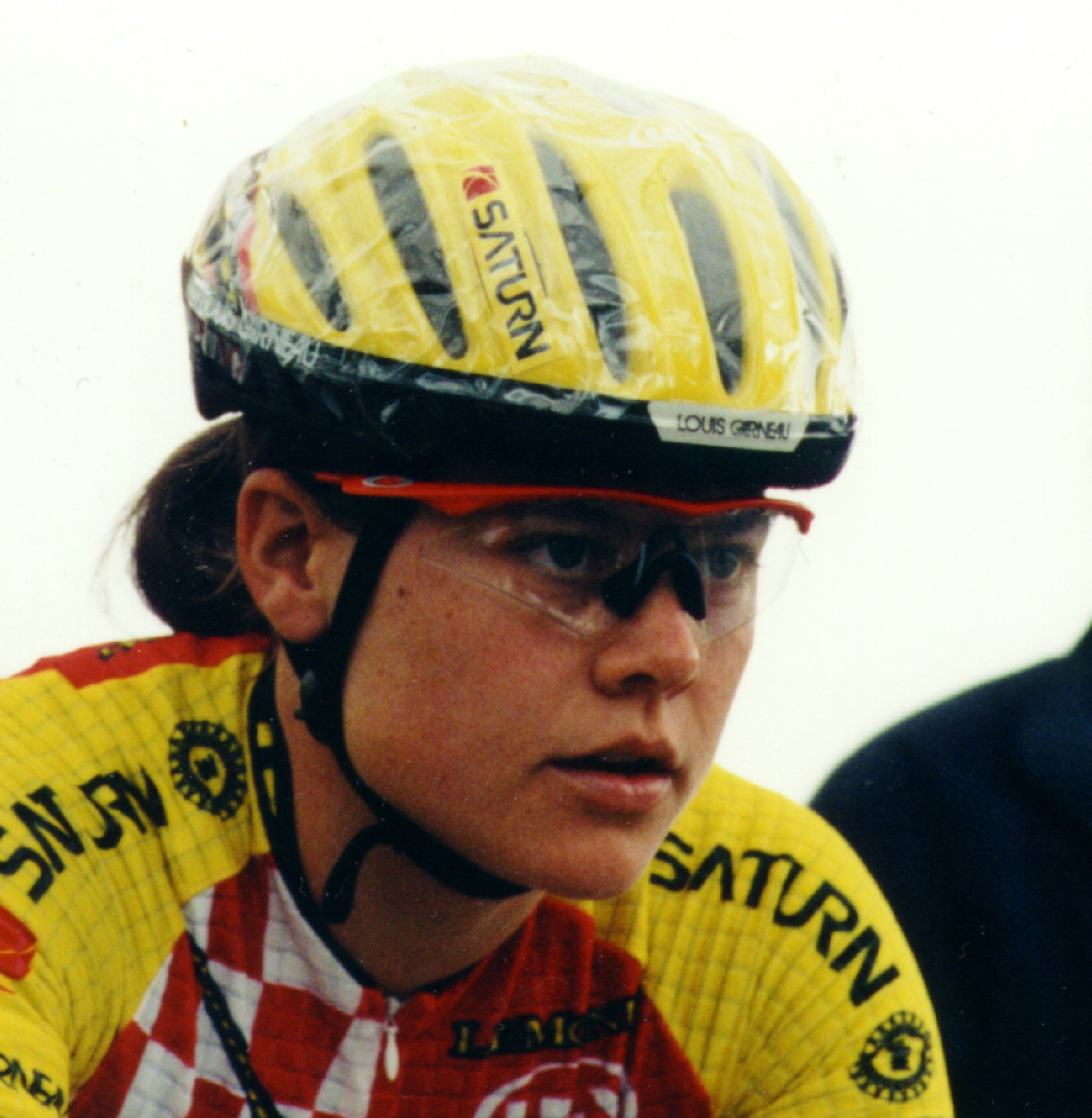
Anna Millward wearing a cycling helmet and eye protectors

Surgeon wearing loupes as eye protection from blood spatter

== See also ==
- Glasses
- Helmet
- Visor
- Protective headgear
- Personal protective equipment
