= Eyeshade =

Eyeshade or eye shade may refer to:

- Cosmetic products which may be applied to the upper eyelid and to the area near the eye to change skin coloration. See eye shadow.
- Blindfolds, such as a sleep-mask
- Visors, surfaces that protects the eyes, such as shading them from the sun.
  - Green eyeshade, an iconic form of type popular in the late 19th and early 20th century
