= Running lights =

Running lights may refer to:

- Lights on vehicles designed to increase visibility while moving - see:

- Daytime running lamp, for increased visibility of vehicles during the day
- Automotive lighting, for running lights for cars
- Bicycle lighting, for running lights for bicycles
- Navigation light, for running lights for aircraft, ships and spacecraft

- Running lights (theater), running lights used in theaters
- Chase lights
- "Running Lights", a song by Sonata Arctica in Pariah's Child
