= Banker's lamp =

Style of table lamp

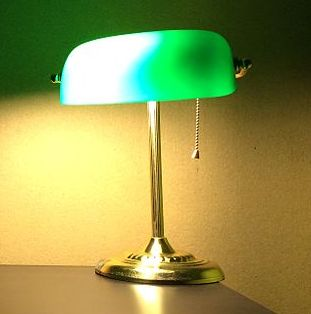
An example of a banker's lamp

The banker's lamp is a style of electric desk or table lamp often characterized by a brass stand, green glass lamp shade, and pull-chain switch. Such a lamp was first patented in the United States under the Emeralite brand name. These types of lamp are frequently used in libraries throughout the United States, which have made the lamp popular through their presence in American pop culture in films and TV series. Other examples can feature different colours of glass and alternative switch types.

The color green was commonly used for the lamp's shade as it was believed to prevent eye strain and to have a calming psychological effect (similar to the use of green eyeshades).

== History ==
The first patent for a banker's lamp was filed on 11 May 1909 by Harrison D. McFaddin, and the lamps were produced, and sold under the brand name Emeralite (from emerald and light). Emeralite lamp shades were produced by the J. Schreiber & Neffen factory located in the town of Rapotín, Moravia. Later competitors were sold as Greenalite, Verdelite, and Amronlite.

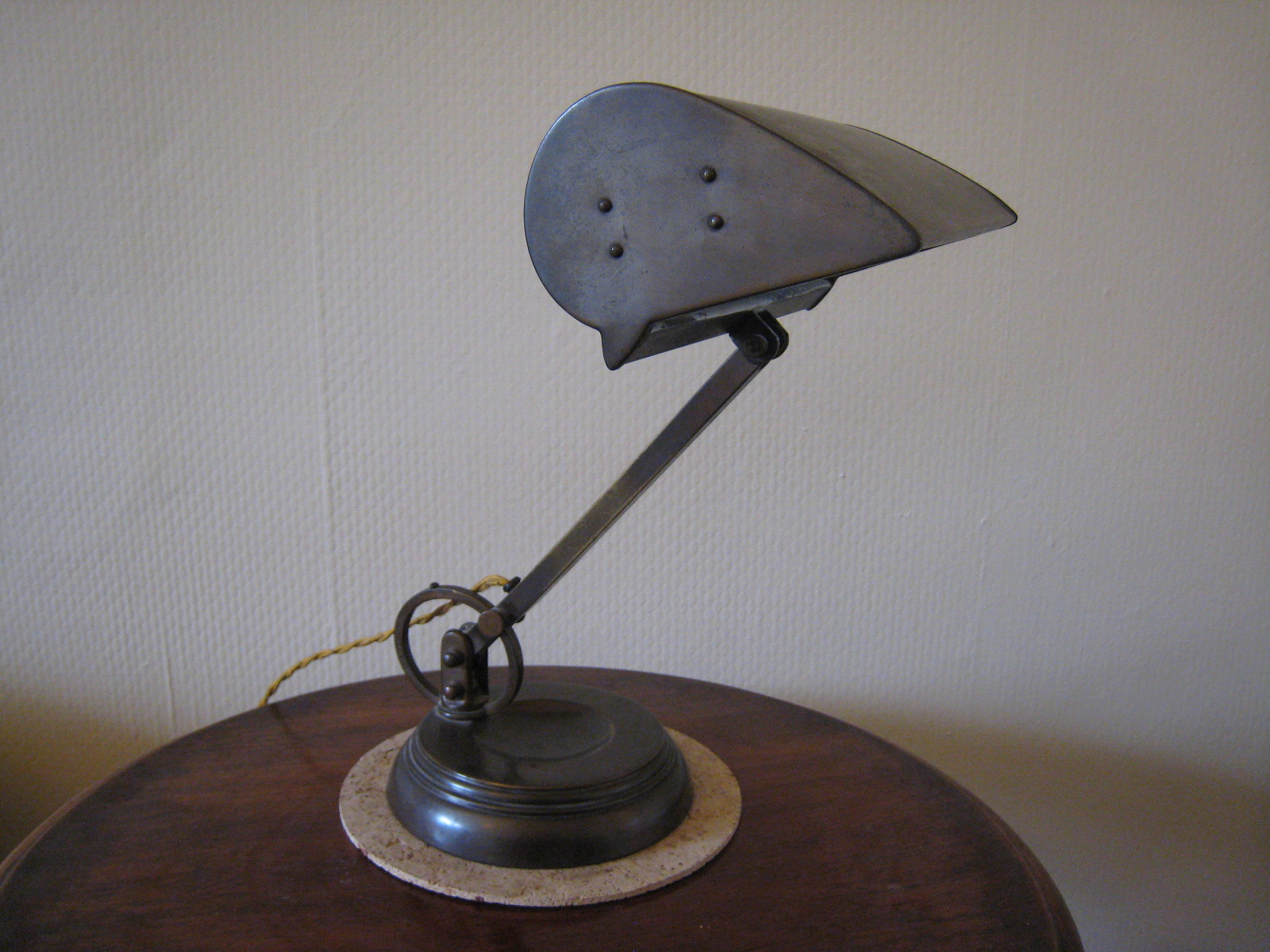
British brass banker's lamp, patented in 1929

A British version of the banker's lamp, a patent for which was filed in 1929, had a solid brass shade and reflector instead of glass. In addition, the positions of both the pedestal and the shade were adjustable. Examples are commonly seen on the secondhand market.

A version of the Emeralite lamp was developed to illuminate piano music.

== Gallery ==
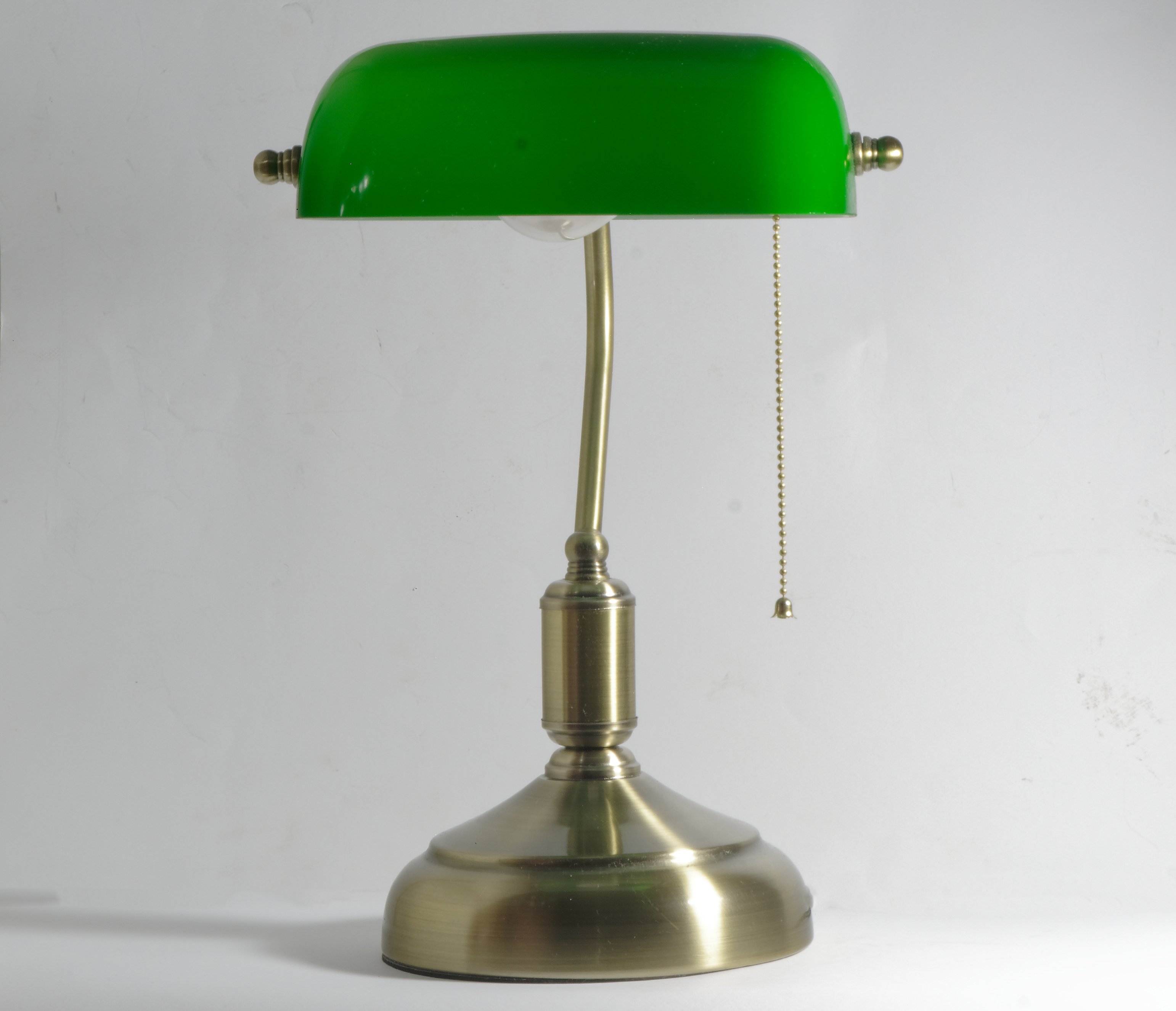
Banker's lamp turned off

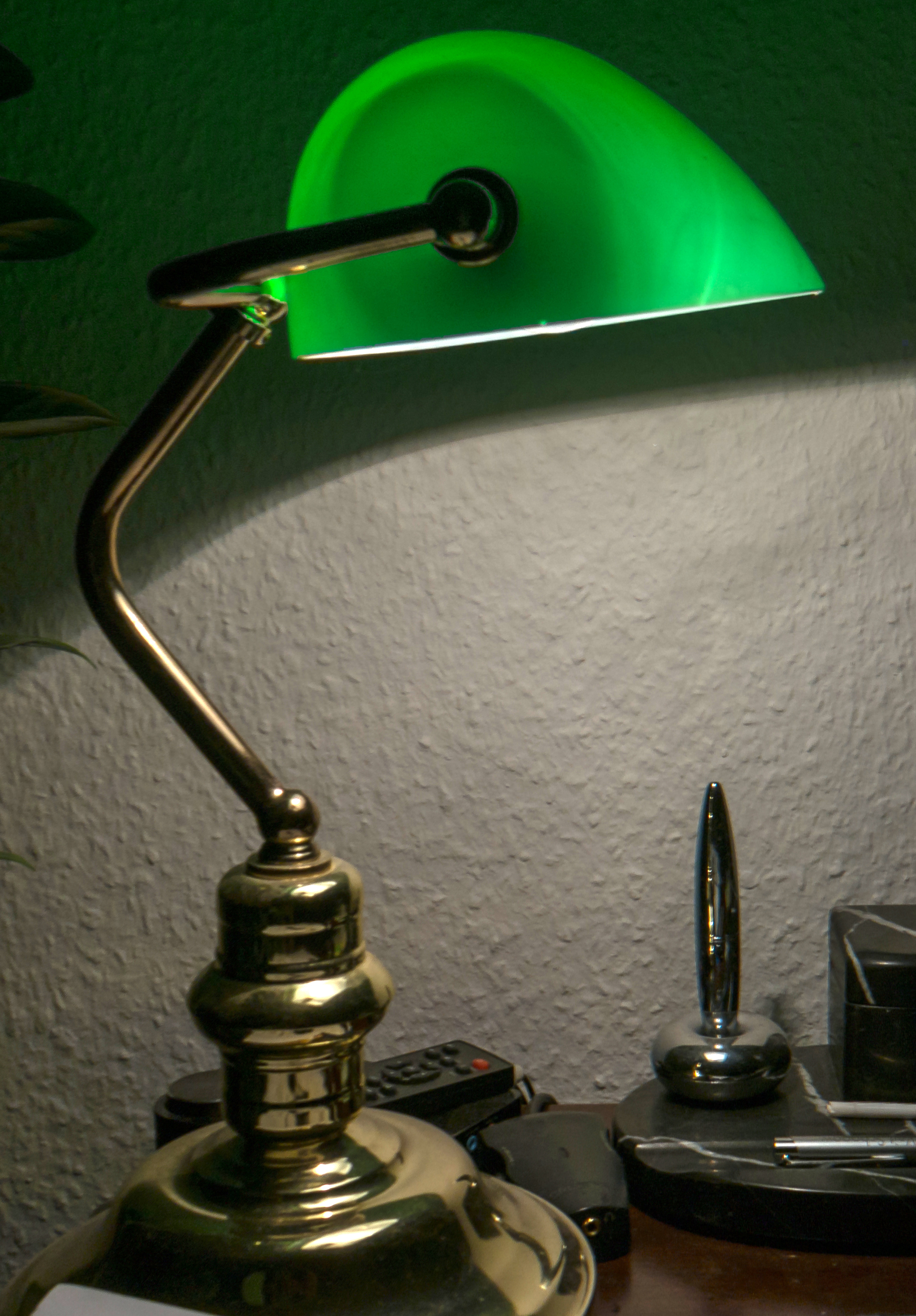
Banker's lamp turned on, in low light

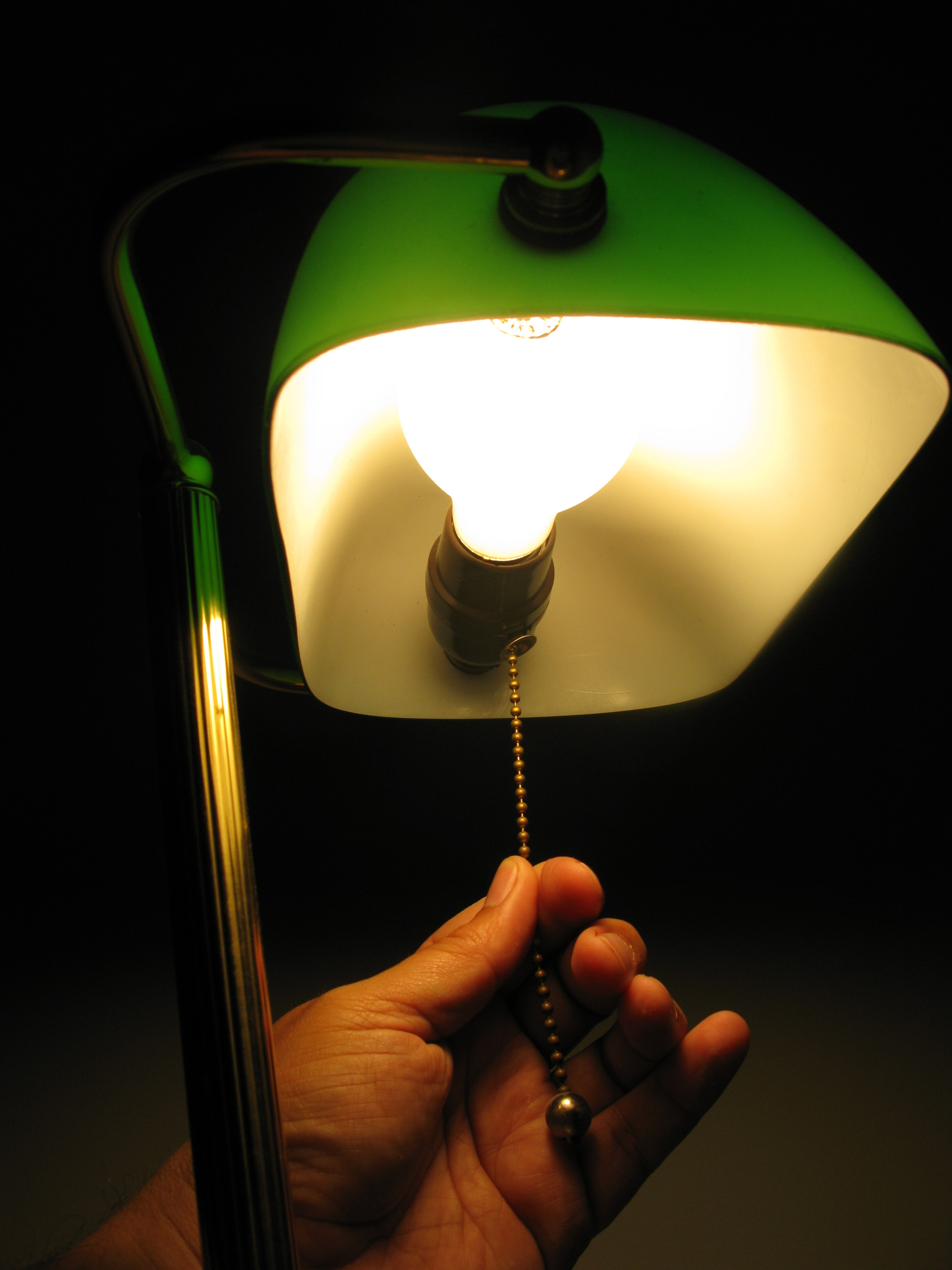
The bulb in the lamp generally emits warm light and is not colourful; any green cast comes from the light filtering through the lampshade.

== See also ==
- Architectural lighting design
- Balanced-arm lamp
- Color psychology
- Emerald
- Gooseneck lamp
- Green eyeshade
- Tiffany lamp
- Worklight
