= Visor =

Surface that protects the eyes

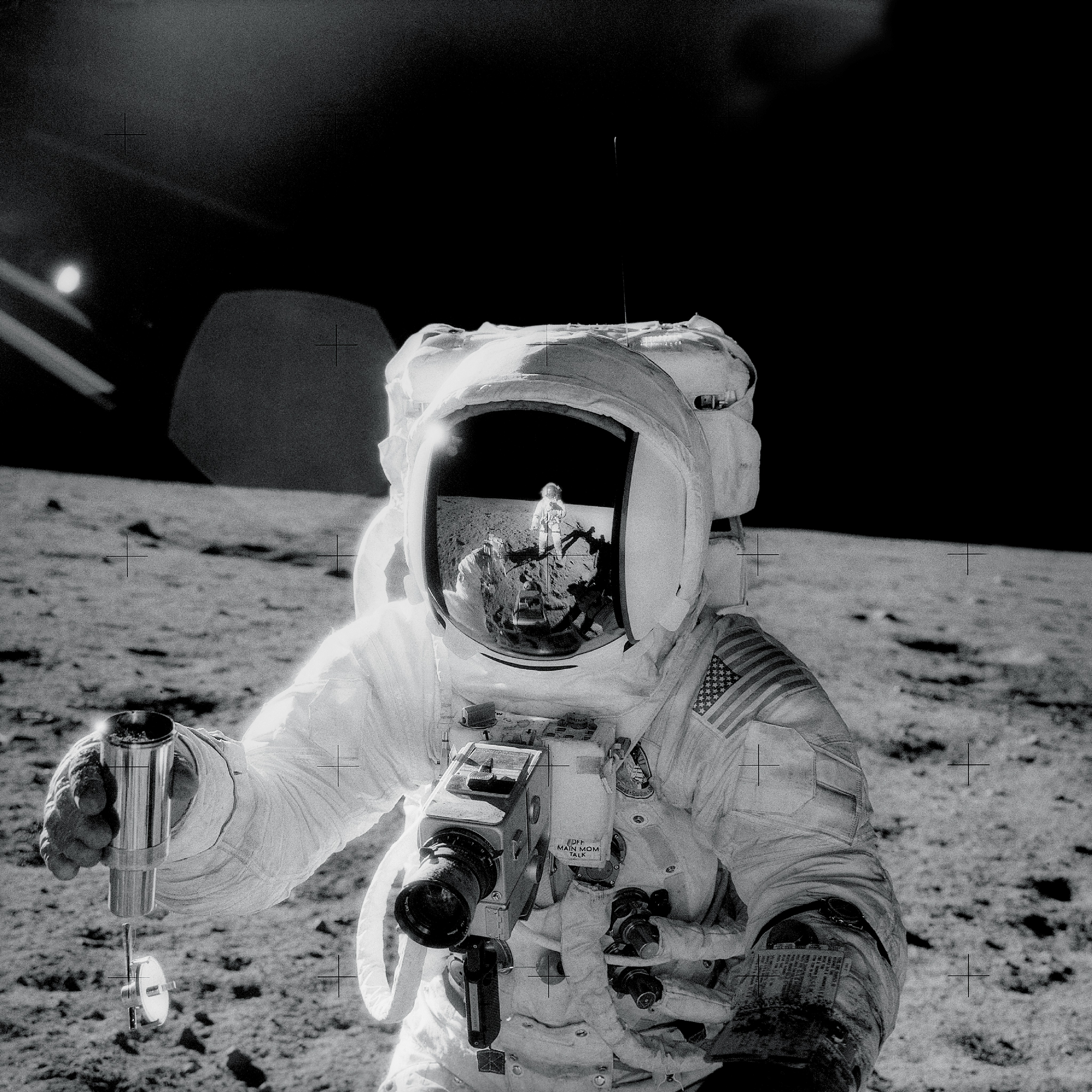
Apollo 12 astronaut Alan Bean, wearing a helmet with visor, during the second moonwalk EVA near Sharp Crater.

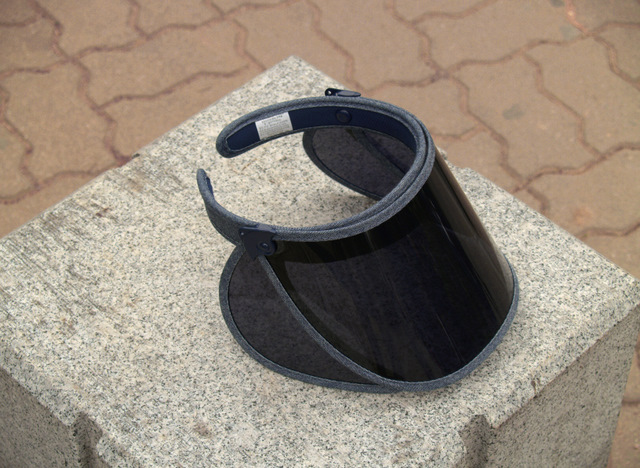
Sports visor designed in Seoul, South Korea

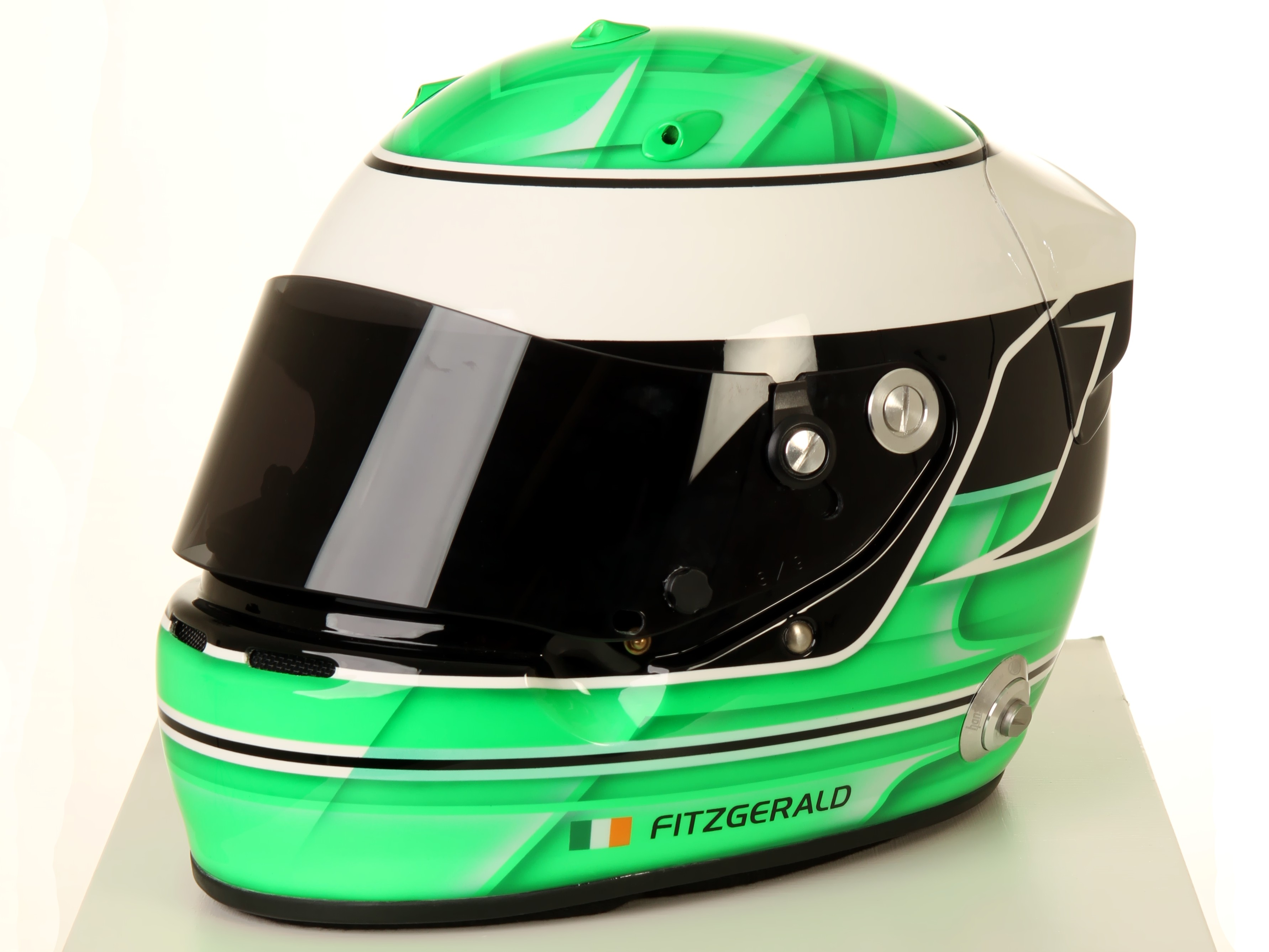
An Arai GP5 racing drivers helmet tinted visor

A visor (Note: Formerly also spelled vizor.) is a surface that protects the eyes, such as shading them from the sun or other bright light or protecting them from objects.

Nowadays many visors are transparent, but before strong transparent substances such as polycarbonate were invented, visors were opaque like a mask.

- The part of a helmet in a suit of armor that protects the eyes.
- A type of headgear consisting only of a visor and a band as a way to fasten it around the head.
- Any such vertical surface on any hat or helmet.
- Any such horizontal surface on any hat or helmet (called a peak in British English).
- A device in an automobile that the driver or front passenger can lower over part of the windshield to block the sun (sun visor).
- As masque costume, Henry VIII and his courtiers wore "visors of good proportion of physiognomy".

== Modern era ==
Some modern devices called visors are similar, for example:

- Visor (ice hockey)

Types of modern transparent visors include:

- The transparent or semi-transparent front part of a motorcycle helmet or riot helmet (sometimes shaded/tinted)
- The transparent or semi-transparent, heavily shaded/tinted, front part of a welding mask
- Safety face shields used in construction, industry, or medical settings
- An eyeshield to protect the eyes from sunlight on an American football helmet
- A shield to protect the eyes from sunlight on a flight helmet or space suit
- Green eyeshades, formerly worn by accountants and others engaged in vision-intensive, detail-oriented occupation.

== See also ==
- Visard, a type of mask worn by fashionable women in the 16th and 17th centuries
