= Welding helmet =

Helmet that protects eyes during welding

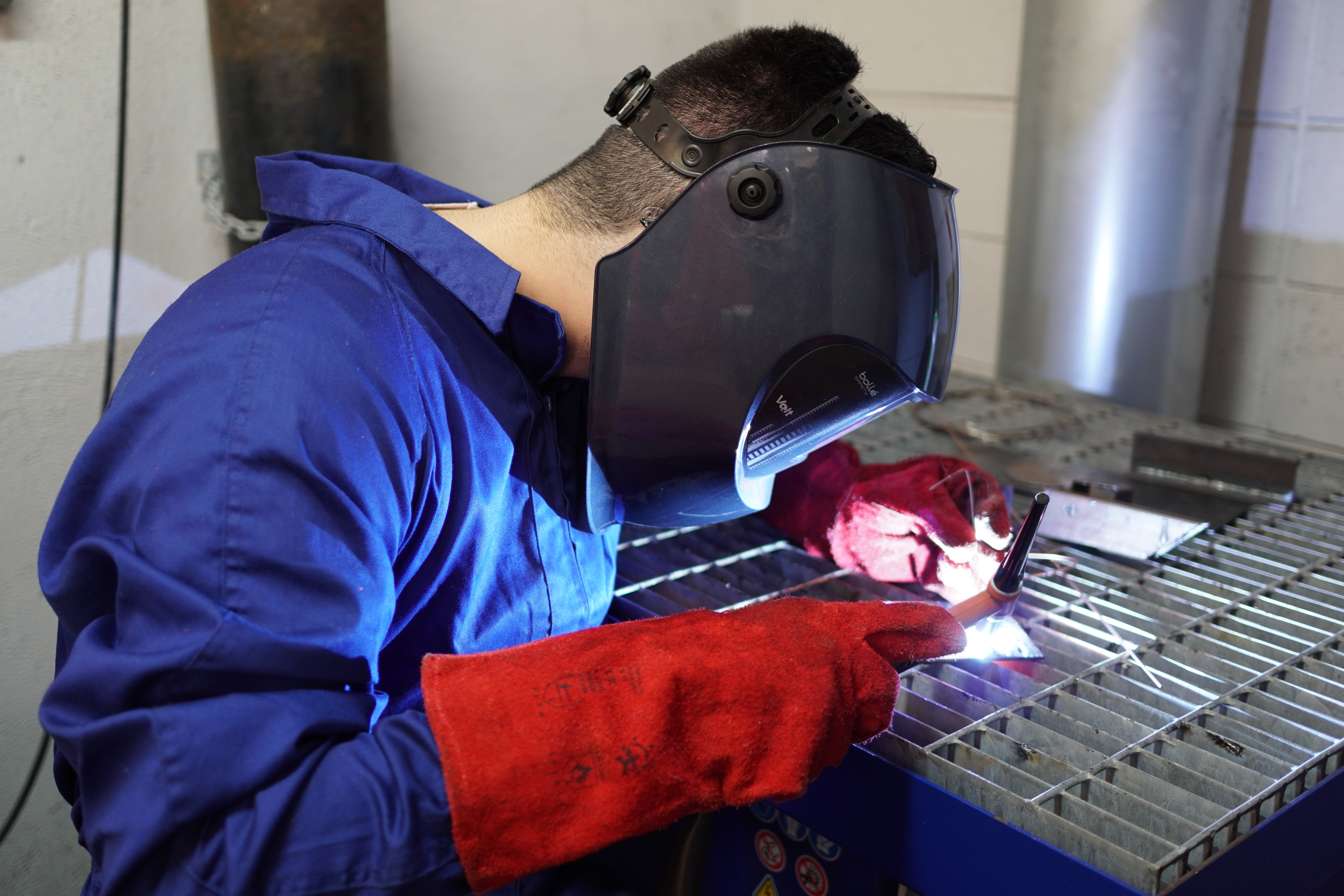
A welding helmet in use

A welding helmet is a piece of personal protective equipment used by welders to protect the user from concentrated light and flying particles. Different welding processes need stronger lens shades with auto-darkening filters, while goggles suffice for others. OSHA and ANSI regulate this technology, defining shades based on the transmittance of light.

== Purpose ==
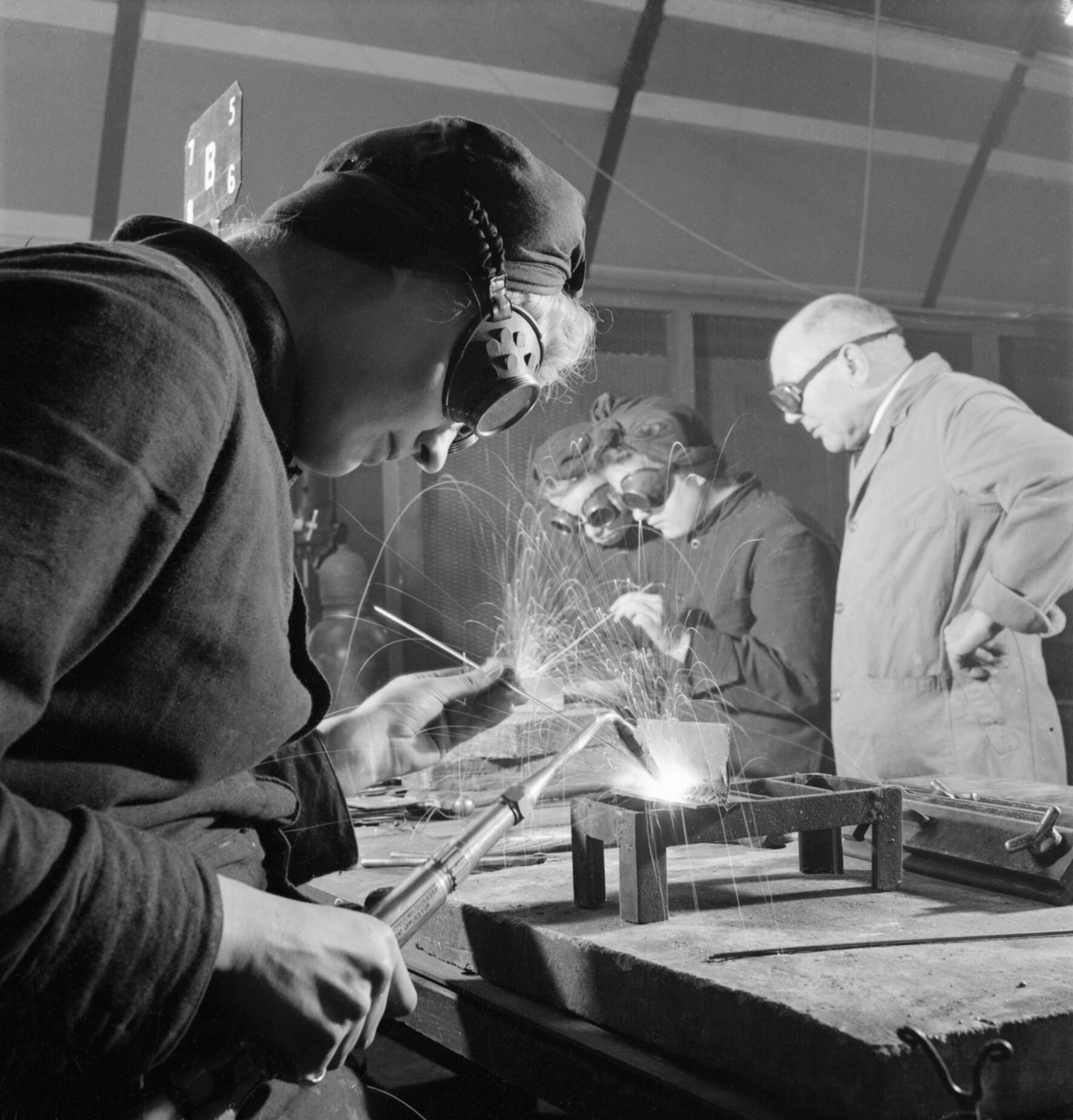
Trainees wearing protective goggles while learning to weld (1943)

Welding helmets are most commonly used in arc welding processes such as shielded metal arc welding, gas tungsten arc welding, and gas metal arc welding. They are necessary to prevent arc eye, a painful condition where the cornea is inflamed. Welding helmets can also prevent retina burns, which can lead to a loss of vision. Both conditions are caused by unprotected exposure to the highly concentrated infrared and ultraviolet light emitted by the welding arc. Ultraviolet emissions from the welding arc can also damage uncovered skin (such as of the face and neck), causing a sunburn-like condition in a relatively short period of welding. In addition to the radiation, gases or splashes can also be a hazard to the skin and the eyes.

All welding helmets are susceptible to damages such as cracks that can compromise the protection from ultraviolet and infrared rays. In addition to protecting the eyes, the helmet protects the face from hot metal sparks generated by the arc and from UV damage. When overhead welding, a leather skull cap and shoulder cover are used to prevent head and shoulder burns.

== Design ==
Most welding helmets include a window (visor) covered with a filter called a lens shade, through which the welder can see to work. The window may be made of tinted glass, tinted plastic, or a variable-density filter made from a pair of polarized lenses. Different lens shades are needed for different welding processes. For example, metal inert gas (MIG) and tungsten inert gas (TIG) welding are low-intensity processes, so a lighter lens shade will be preferred.

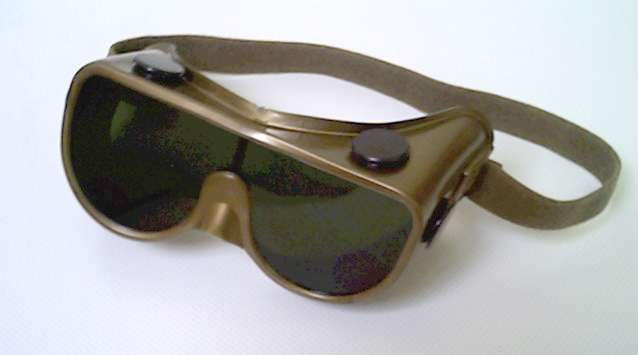
Oxyfuel welding goggles

Welding goggles are protective eyewear that has dark shading, meant to protect eyes from the bright light produced by oxyfuel welding and allied processes, and also from sparks and debris. Open electrical arcs (as created by arc welding and other processes) generate much higher amounts of light and UV radiation, requiring the whole face to be protected; most welding goggles do not have a dark enough shade for arc welding.

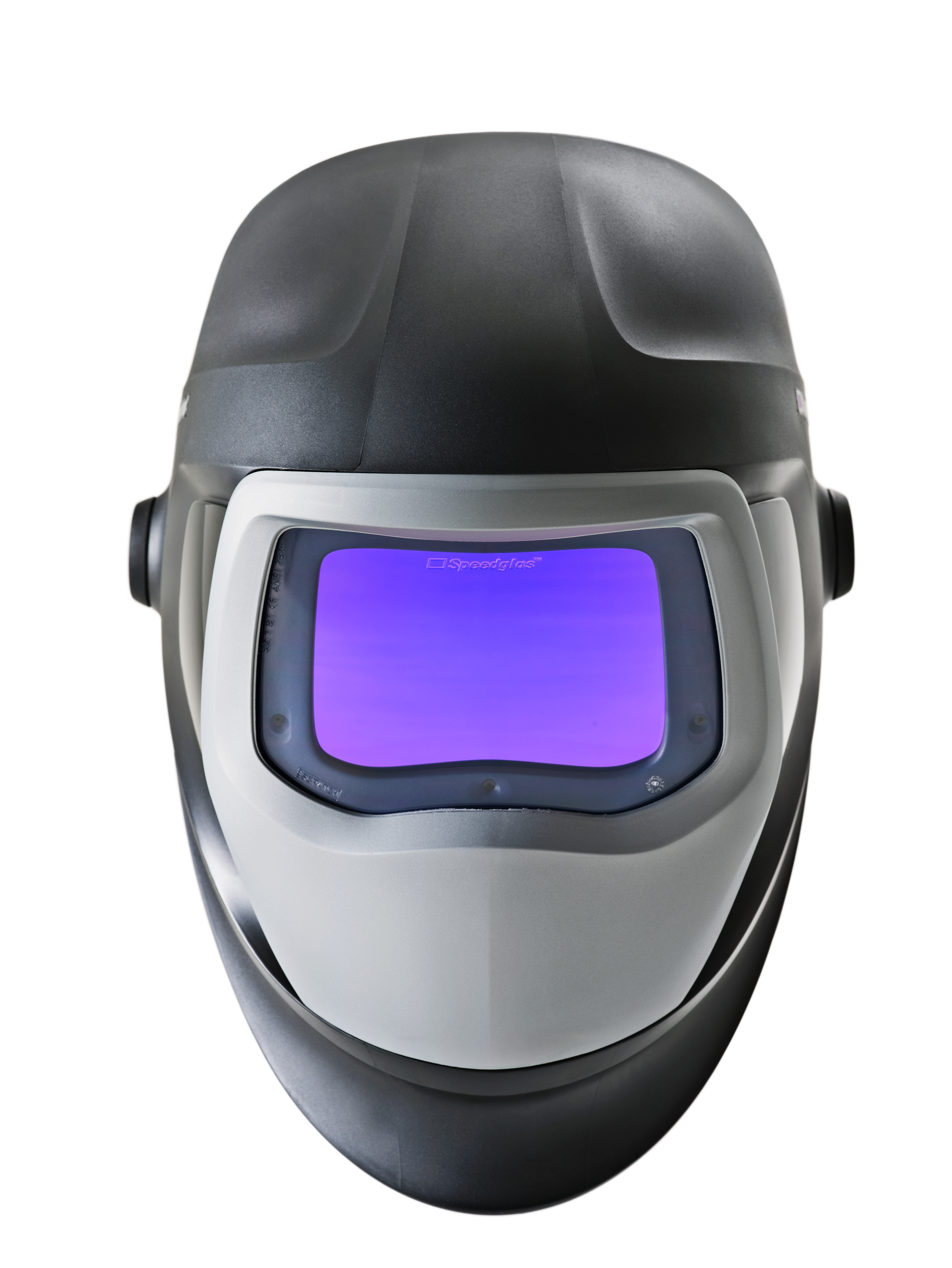
Speedglas welding helmet

The modern welding helmet used today was first introduced in 1937 by Willson Products. In 1981, Swedish manufacturer Hornell International (now owned by 3M) introduced an LCD electronic shutter that darkens automatically when sensors detect the bright welding arc, the Speedglas Auto-Darkening Filter. With such electronic auto-darkening helmets, the welder no longer has to get ready to weld and then nod their head to lower the helmet over their face. The advantage is that the welder does not need to adjust the position of welding helmet manually, which not only saves time but also reduces the risk of exposure to the harmful light generated by the welding process.

== Regulation ==
In the United States, the industry standard for welding helmets is ANSI Z87.1+, which specifies performance of a wide variety of eye protection devices. The standard requires that auto-darkening helmets provide full protection against both UV and IR even when they are not in the darkened state. The standard is voluntary, so buyers should confirm that the helmet is ANSI Z87.1 compliant (indicated by appropriate labeling).

United States OSHA requirements for welding helmets are derived from standards like ANSI Z49.1, Safety in Welding and Cutting, section 7 (Protection of Personnel) and ANSI Z89.1 (Safety Requirements for Industrial Head Protection). OSHA also recommends certain shade numbers based on the weld's type and current rating.

The 1967 edition of ANSI Z49.1.7.2.2.10 specifies that "all filter lenses and plates shall meet the test for transmission of radiant energy prescribed in paragraph 6.3.4.6 of the Safety Code for Head, Eye and Respiratory Protection, USA Standard Z2.1-1959".

As of 2023, OSHA's website provides standards for minimum protective shades under standard 1910.133 (Eye and face protection), section (a)(5):

As a rule of thumb, start with a shade that is too dark to see the weld zone. Then go to a lighter shade which gives sufficient view of the weld zone without going below the minimum. In oxyfuel gas welding or cutting where the torch produces a high yellow light, it is desirable to use a filter lens that absorbs the yellow or sodium line in the visible light of the (spectrum) operation.

== Shades ==
Per ANSI Z87.1-2003, "shade numbers" are derived as such:

Shade Number, $S$, is related to luminous transmittance $T_{L}$ (expressed as a fraction, not as a percent) by the equation:

$S = \dfrac{7}{3} \log_{10}\dfrac{1}{T_{L}} + 1$

$T_{L}$ is defined with respect to CIE Illuminant A (i.e. a reference point for typical domestic incandescent lighting) and the CIE 1931 Standard Colorimetric Observer.

The actual ANSI-specified shades are not specific numbers, but ranges; each has a designated maximum, minimum, and nominal transmittance value. Moreover, acceptable transmittance values for far ultraviolet are far lower than those for the Illuminant A light ("shall be less than one tenth of the minimum allowable luminous transmittance").

=== Transmittance values ===
While ANSI shades are ranges based on a specific illuminant, and do not directly convert into other measurements of transmittance, the following table gives a rough approximation (in terms of neutral density filter numbers and f-stops).

Notation				Lens area opening, as fraction of the complete lens	f-stop reduction (approx.)	ANSI shade (approx.)	Fractional transmittance	
Optical density	ND.number	ND1number	NDnumber	Lens area opening, as fraction of the complete lens	f-stop reduction (approx.)	ANSI shade (approx.)	Fractional transmittance	
0.0				1	0	—	100%	1
0.3	ND 0.3	ND 101	ND2	1/2	1	1.7	50%	0.5
0.6	ND 0.6	ND 102	ND4	1/4	2	2.4	25%	0.25
0.9	ND 0.9	ND 103	ND8	1/8	3	3.11	12.5%	0.125
1.0	ND 1.0		ND10	1/10	≈ 3 1/3	3.33	10 %	0.10
1.2	ND 1.2	ND 104	ND16	1/16	4	3.81	6.25%	0.0625
1.5	ND 1.5	ND 105	ND32	1/32	5	4.51	3.125%	0.03125
1.8	ND 1.8	ND 106	ND64	1/64	6	5.21	1.563%	0.015625
2.0	ND 2.0		ND100	1/100	≈ 6 2/3	5.67	1%	0.01
2.1	ND 2.1	ND 107	ND128	1/128	7	5.92	0.781%	0.0078125
2.4	ND 2.4	ND 108	ND256	1/256	8	6.62	0.391%	0.00390625
2.6			ND400	1/400	≈ 8 2/3	7.07	0.25%	0.0025
2.7	ND 2.7	ND 109	ND512	1/512	9	7.32	0.195%	0.001953125
3.0	ND 3.0	ND 110	ND1024 (also called ND1000)	1/1024	10	8.00	0.1%	0.001
3.3	ND 3.3	ND 111	ND2048	1/2048	11	8.72	0.049%	0.00048828125
3.6	ND 3.6	ND 112	ND4096	1/4096	12	9.45	0.024%	0.000244140625
3.8	ND 3.8		ND6310	1/6310	≈ 12 2/3	9.86	0.016%	0.000158489319246
3.9	ND 3.9	ND 113	ND8192	1/8192	13	10.15	0.012%	0.0001220703125
4.0	ND 4.0		ND10000	1/10000	≈ 13 1/3	10.33	0.01%	0.0001
5.0	ND 5.0		ND100000	1/100000	≈ 16 2/3	12.67	0.001%	0.00001
5.6	ND 5.6		ND400000	1/400000	≈ 18 2/3	14.07	0.00025%	0.0000025

- Note: Hoya, B+W, Cokin use code ND2 or ND2x, etc.; Lee, Tiffen use code 0.3ND, etc.; Leica uses code 1×, 4×, 8×, etc.
- Note: ND 3.8 is the correct value for solar CCD exposure without risk of electronic damage.
- Note: ND 5.0 is the minimum for direct eye solar observation without damage of retina. A further check must be performed for the particular filter used, checking on the spectrogram that also UV and IR are mitigated with the same value.Common ISO 12312-2:2015 filters for Sun observation are ND 5.6
- Note: ANSI shades are defined by standard as ranges with central values. They are here approximated using the equation from ANSI Z87.1, $S = \dfrac{7}{3} log_{10}\dfrac{1}{T_{L}} + 1$, which bases luminous transmittance ($T_{L}$) on CIE Illuminant A; ANSI shade numbers have much lower limits for ultraviolet transmittance.
