= Visor (armor) =

Armored covering for the face

A visor was an armored covering for the face often used in conjunction with Late Medieval war helmets such as the bascinet or sallet. The visor usually consisted of a hinged piece of steel that contained openings for breathing and vision. Appropriately, breaths refers to the holes in the metal of the visor. Visors protected the face during battle and could be remarkably durable. One surviving artifact was found to be "equivalent in hardness to cold worked high speed steel."

== History ==
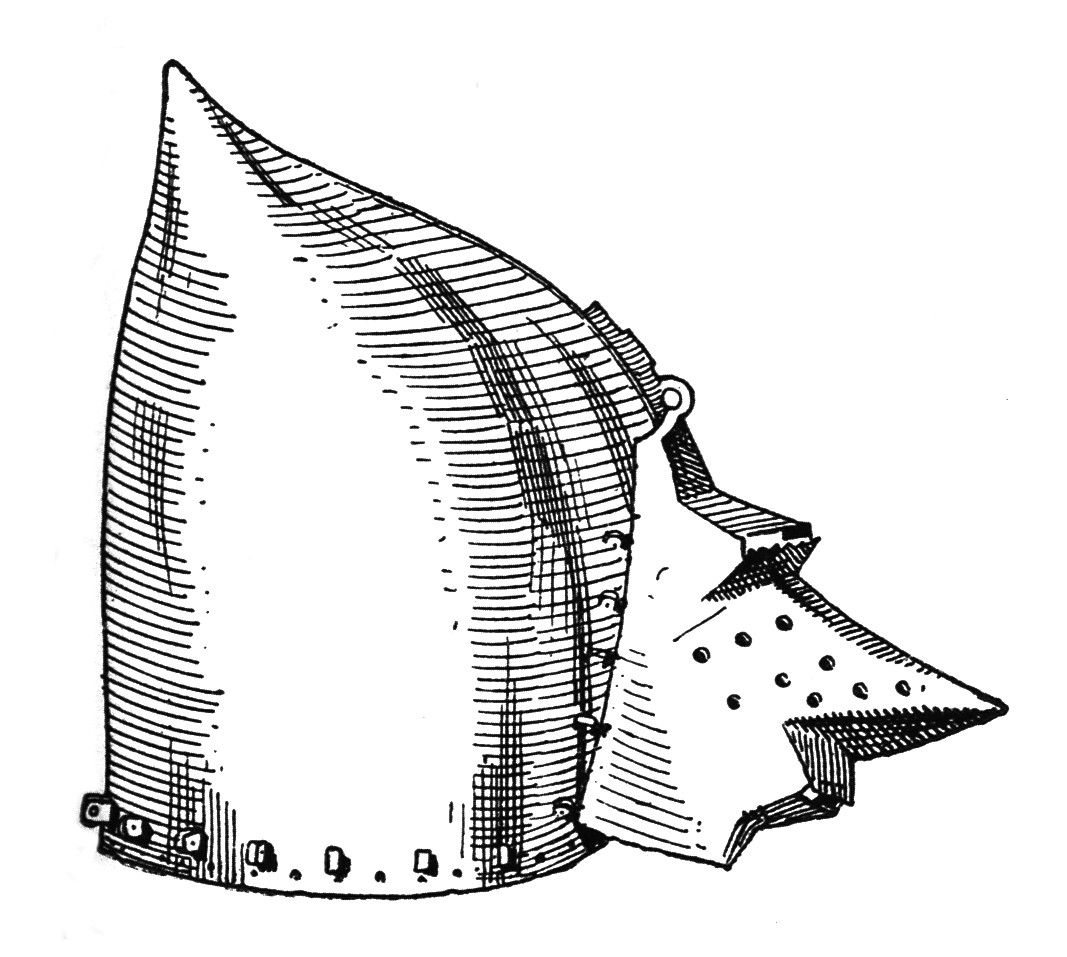
Fourteenth century klappvisier, an early form of visored basinet

The first recorded European reference to a helmet's visor in the Middle Ages is found in the 1298 will of Odo de Roussillon, which speaks of a heume a vissere. Whether this statement refers to a pivoting visor or a fixed faceplate is not clear; but by the early fourteenth century artistic depictions of moving visors appear quite frequently. The popularization of the visor also increased the practical value of armorial surcoats in battle, since when the visor was down "it was no longer possible to distinguish king from subject, leader from stranger, comrade from foe". As such, the visor may have led to the design of more complex forms of livery.

In addition to material artifacts, written accounts provide some evidence for the effectiveness of visors. Mounted jousters appear to have benefited particularly from the use of visors. In his account of peacetime jousts at Saint-Inglevert, French chronicler Jean Froissart provides an example of visored helmets being used in tournament. Froissart describes the visors as being durable enough to withstand a blow from a couched lance, writing that "the steel tips struck the visors of [the jousting knights] so strongly and directly that the two were unhelmed." The style of visor employed in the joust is not clear from Froissart's account. When wearing an open-faced helmet, some knights would utilize the top of a shield to create a visor-like defense. Castilian chronicler Fernao Lopes describes such a situation taking place in a 1387 joust, wherein one knight held his shield "so that only his right eye was visible." Whether this was a strategic alternative to the use of a visor or simply an accommodation for inferior armor is unclear.

Visors are also mentioned in accounts of Late Medieval warfare. The author of the Gesta Henrici Quinti makes mention of the use of visored helms by French nobles at the Battle of Agincourt: "But the French nobles, who had previously advanced together in the front, so that they had almost come into contact with us, either fearing our missiles, whose might had pierced through the sides and visors of their helms...divided themselves into three parts." While the account displays a strong propagandist tone, it suggests that stray arrows could penetrate a visor, presumably by striking in the opening provided for the wearer's vision.

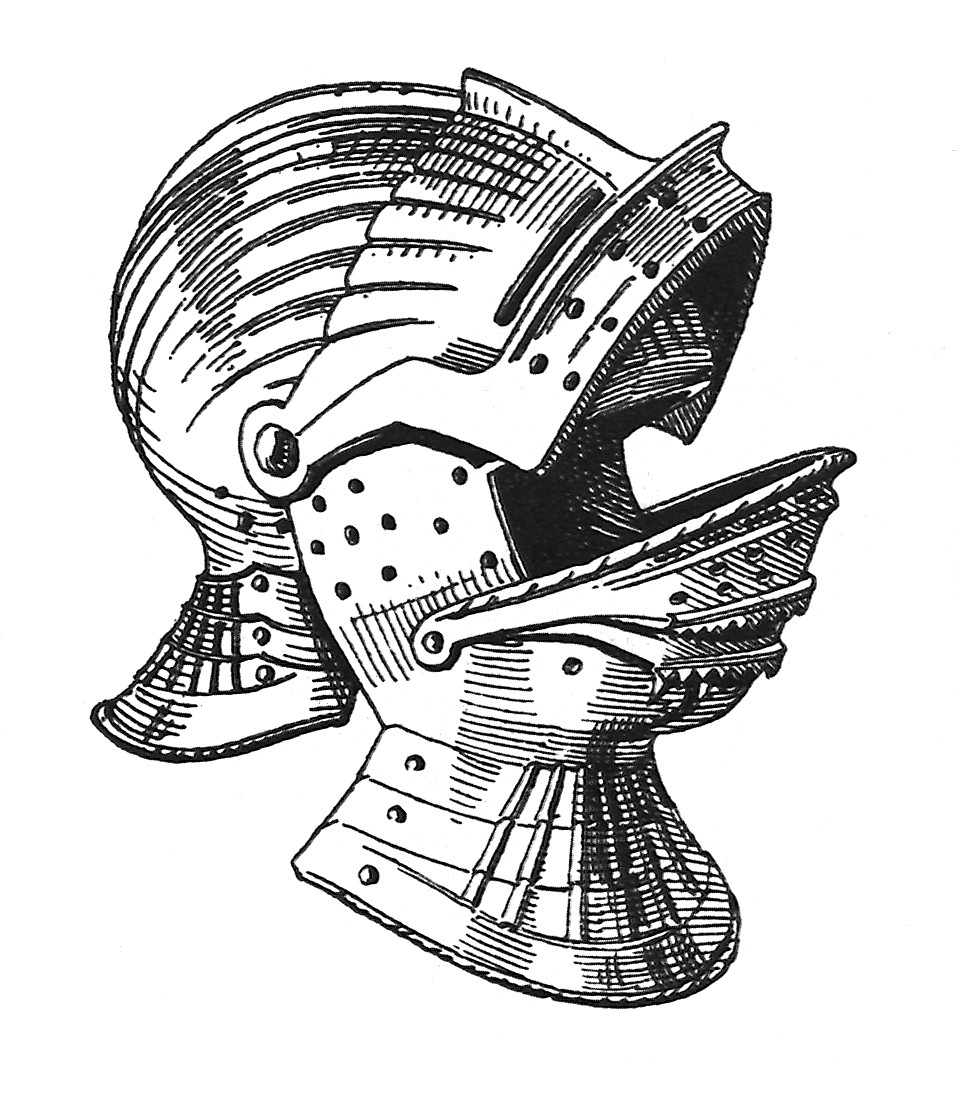
Example of a sixteenth century double-visored sallet

Despite the necessary inclusion of an opening through which a wearer might see, a visor might substantially impair the user's field of vision. For this reason, many visors could be lifted if needed. Muslim chronicler Imad ad-Din depicts Christian crusaders "with raised visors amid the swords" at the Battle of Hattin in 1187. The account provided by Imad ad-Din suggests the crusaders lifted the visor in response to being unhorsed, perhaps implying that closed visors were favored by cavalry more than infantry.

== Cultural legacy ==
Visors played an important role in Late Medieval and Early Modern literature, allowing for a dramatic reveal of a character's identity. Sir Thomas Malory employs this tactic in Le Morte d'Arthur , wherein a damsel commands a knight she believes is Sir Lancelot to "put up thy visage" only to discover that he is actually Sir Tristam de Lyones.

Whether the literary usage of visored helmets corresponded to actual battlefield practice is less clear. For instance, the word beaver is sometimes used interchangeably with visor, as in Shakespeare's Hamlet, when Prince Hamlet and Horatio are discussing the Ghost. Hamlet says: "Then saw you not his face?" to which Horatio responds "O yes, my lord. He wore his beaver up." This may be misleading, however, as the term "beaver" can also refer to a piece of plate-armor which protected the neck.

The French literary critic Jacques Derrida references the literary power of the visor in Specters of Marx, viewing the visor as conferring "the power to see without being seen" on the wearer.

In contemporary media, many films portray knights in visored helmets, such as the 2001 feature film A Knight's Tale.
