= Sports visor =

Type of crownless hat

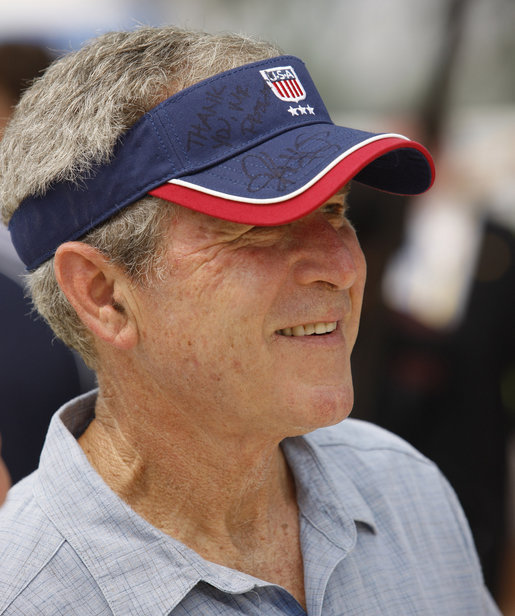
Former President George W. Bush wears a sports visor courtesy of the U.S. Beach Volleyball team at the 2008 Olympic Games in Beijing

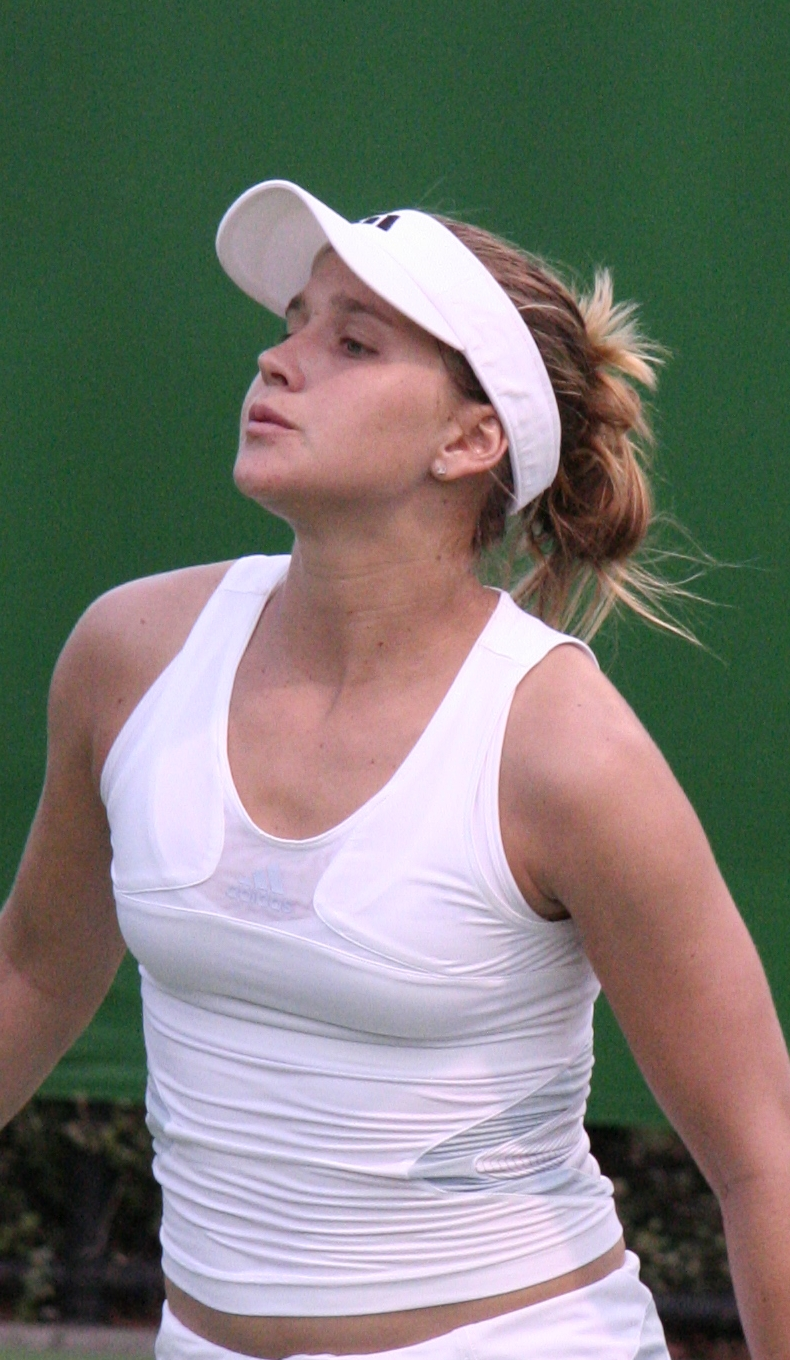
Tennis player Ashley Harkleroad wears a sports visor at the 2007 Australian Open

A sports visor, also called a sun visor or visor cap, is a type of headgear that consists of a bill to shade the eyes, attached to a headband used to secure it to the head. Some visors have a very large bill that can shade most of the entire face, while others have a bill similar to that of a baseball cap. Sports visors are often worn in hot sunny weather, where shading the eyes and face is desirable, but where trapped heat from a traditional baseball cap is not wanted.

== See also ==
- Green eyeshade
- List of hat styles
- Sportswear
- Sun hat
