= Running lights (theater) =

In theater, running lights are any lights that the audience does not see, but are on during a performance. They are different from worklights which are not used during a show. One type of running light is the lights set in wings or crossovers for actors and technicians to find their way in the (mostly) dark. These are usually rope lights or traditional fixtures with a colored lamp or colored gel over them. Booth staff will also use running lights to illuminate control boards or scripts. One brand marketed for this specific purpose is LittLite. Cue lights are distinct from running lights.
