= Worklight =

Theatrical lighting fixture

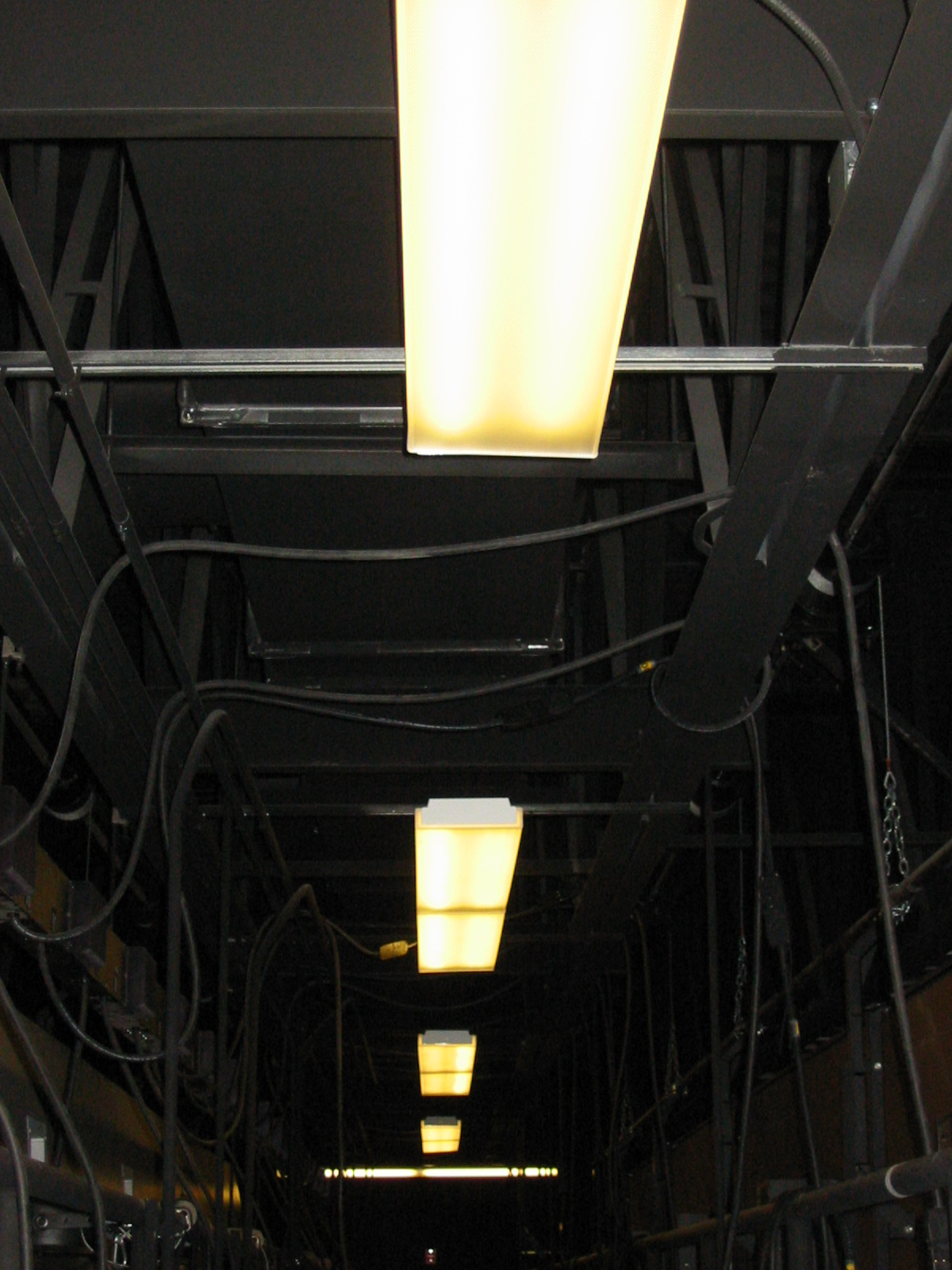
Normal worklights

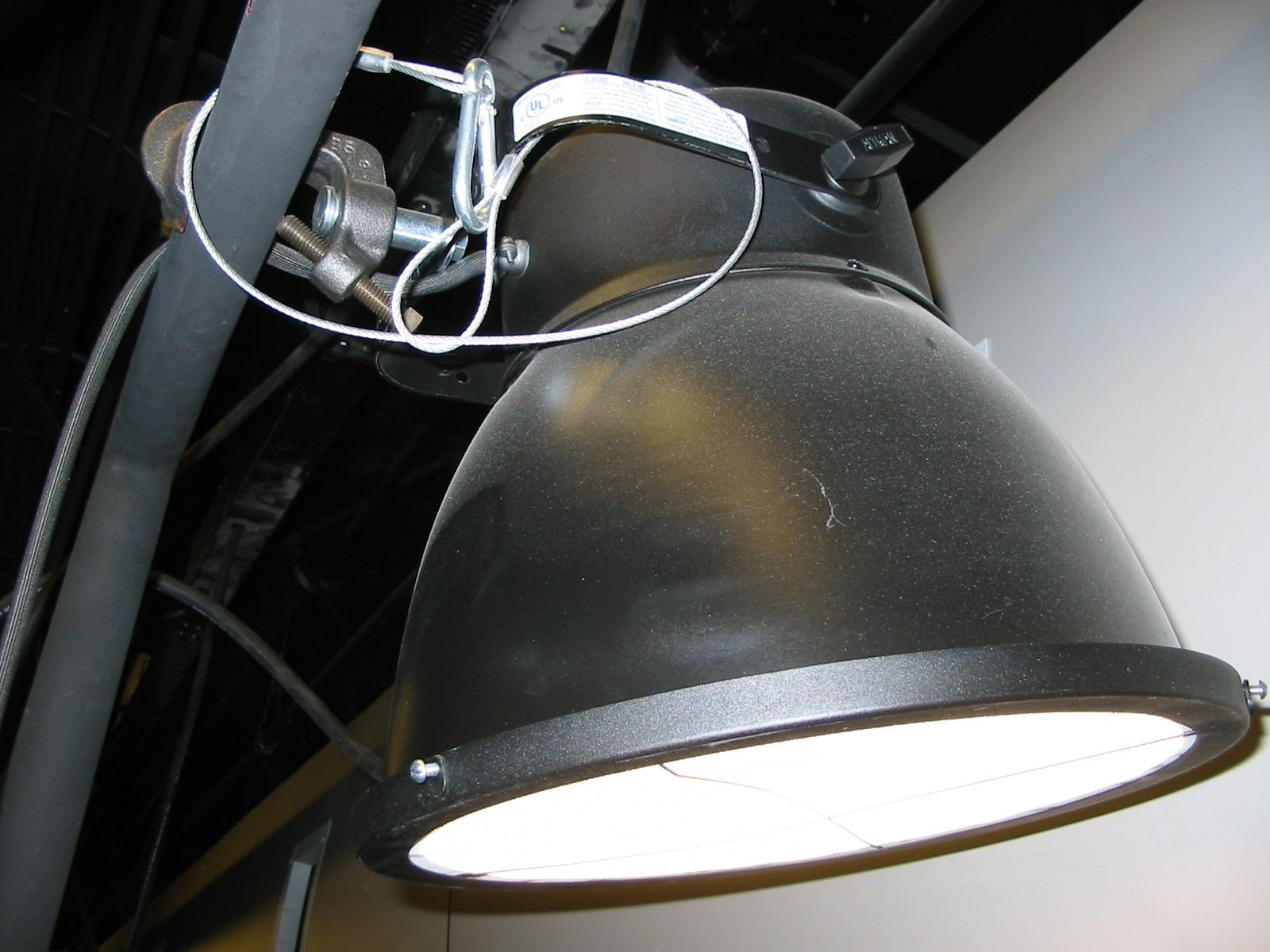
Scoops can also be used for worklights

In theater, a worklight is a high-intensity light fixture which is used to illuminate the stage for the benefit of technicians. Technicians use these lights, rather than the stage lights for a number of reasons. Firstly, it takes much less technical knowledge to turn on worklights, so even people with no knowledge of electrics can turn them on. Secondly, regardless of the lights hung for the specific show, they provide fairly consistent and complete lighting. Finally, and most importantly, they are designed to be cheap and easy to re-lamp, in contrast to theatrical fixtures, which have expensive lamps and would burn through color gels if used to illuminate stage work.

Worklights are not designed to light the stage in an aesthetically pleasing way, but rather to be efficient in terms of space and heat; however, they may occasionally be used to emphasize plot elements during a show. They are generally near-white. Worklights are usually placed on catwalks and battens, or can be permanently built in. If not hardwired into the control system, the connectors are often marked or attached in a way to prevent them from mistakenly being removed during a strike/load out.

Worklights can also be used during performances and rehearsals, to provide dim lighting for technicians backstage.

== Types of worklights ==
Worklights are often built into a theatre as a fluorescent light, as in the photo at the top right. However, some theatres may use, as a supplement to or instead of the fluorescent lights, either the normal stage lights (which produce a lot of heat) or just scoops.

== See also ==
- Running lights (theater)
- LED lamp
