= Green eyeshade =

Type of visor

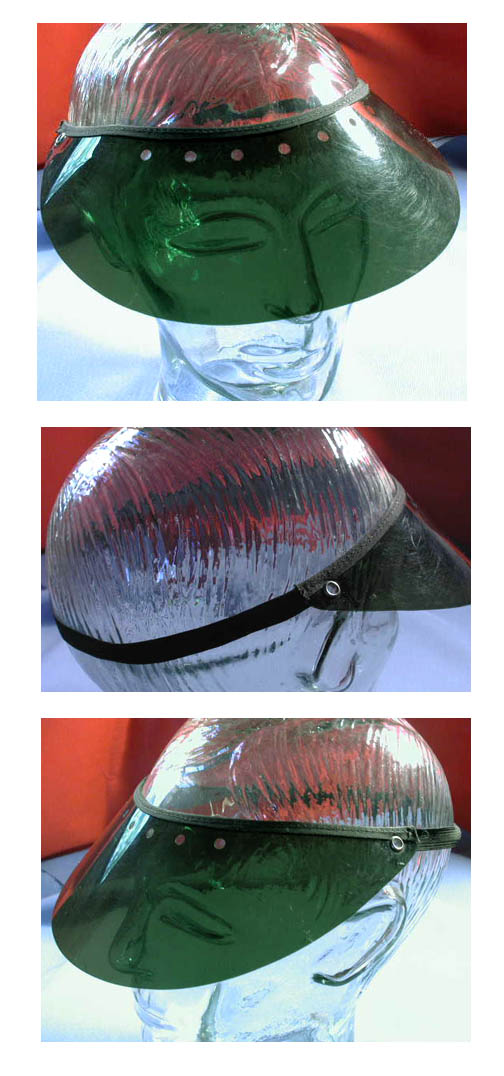
A green eyeshade

Green eyeshades or dealer's visors are a type of visor that were worn most often from the late 19th century to the mid-20th century by accountants, telegraphers, copy editors, and others engaged in vision-intensive, detail-oriented occupations to lessen eye strain due to early incandescent lights and candles, which tended to be harsh; the classic banker's lamp had a green shade for similar reasons. Because they were often worn by people involved in accounting, auditing, economics, and budgeting, they became associated with these activities.

Green eyeshades were often made of a translucent dark green- or blue-green-colored celluloid, although leather and paper were also sometimes used to make the visor portion. One manufacturer, the Featherweight Eyeshade Company, described their eyeshade as "healthful, color peculiarly restful to the eyes". They retain some popularity in the gambling community.

== In popular culture ==
The Society of Professional Journalists annually recognizes deserving journalists working in the Southern United States with its Green Eyeshade Excellence in Journalism Award.

The phrase "green eyeshades" can be used as a synecdoche for individuals who are excessively concerned with financial matters or small and insignificant details.

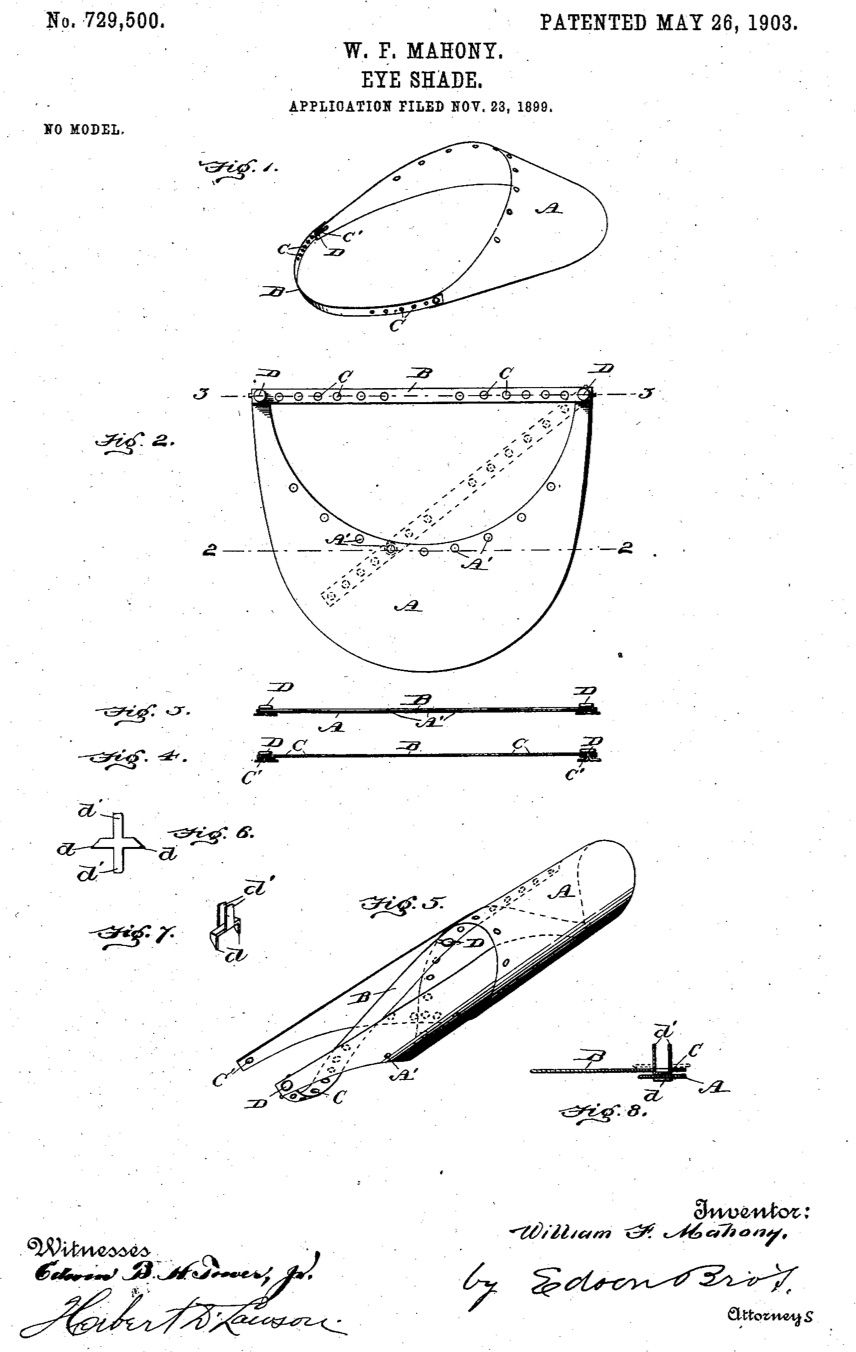
Patent for green eyeshade by W. F. Mahony in 1903

== See also ==
- Architectural lighting design
- Ergonomics
- Green
- List of hat styles
- Photophobia
- Snow goggles
- Sports visor
