= Party Lights =

Party Lights may refer to:

- "Party Lights," a 1962 single by Claudine Clark from her album of the same name
- "Party Lights," a song by Natalie Cole on her 1977 album Unpredictable
- "Party Lights," a song by Bruce Springsteen on his 2015 album The Ties That Bind: The River Collection

== See also ==
- DJ lighting
