= Cucoloris =

Theatrical lighting device

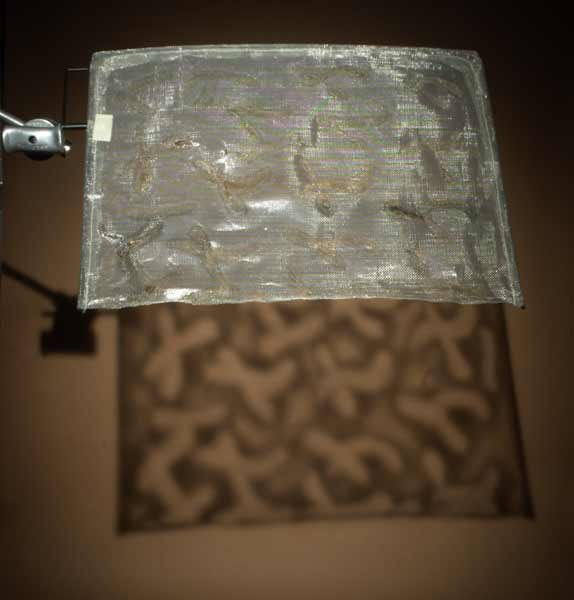
A celo cucoloris casting a shadow

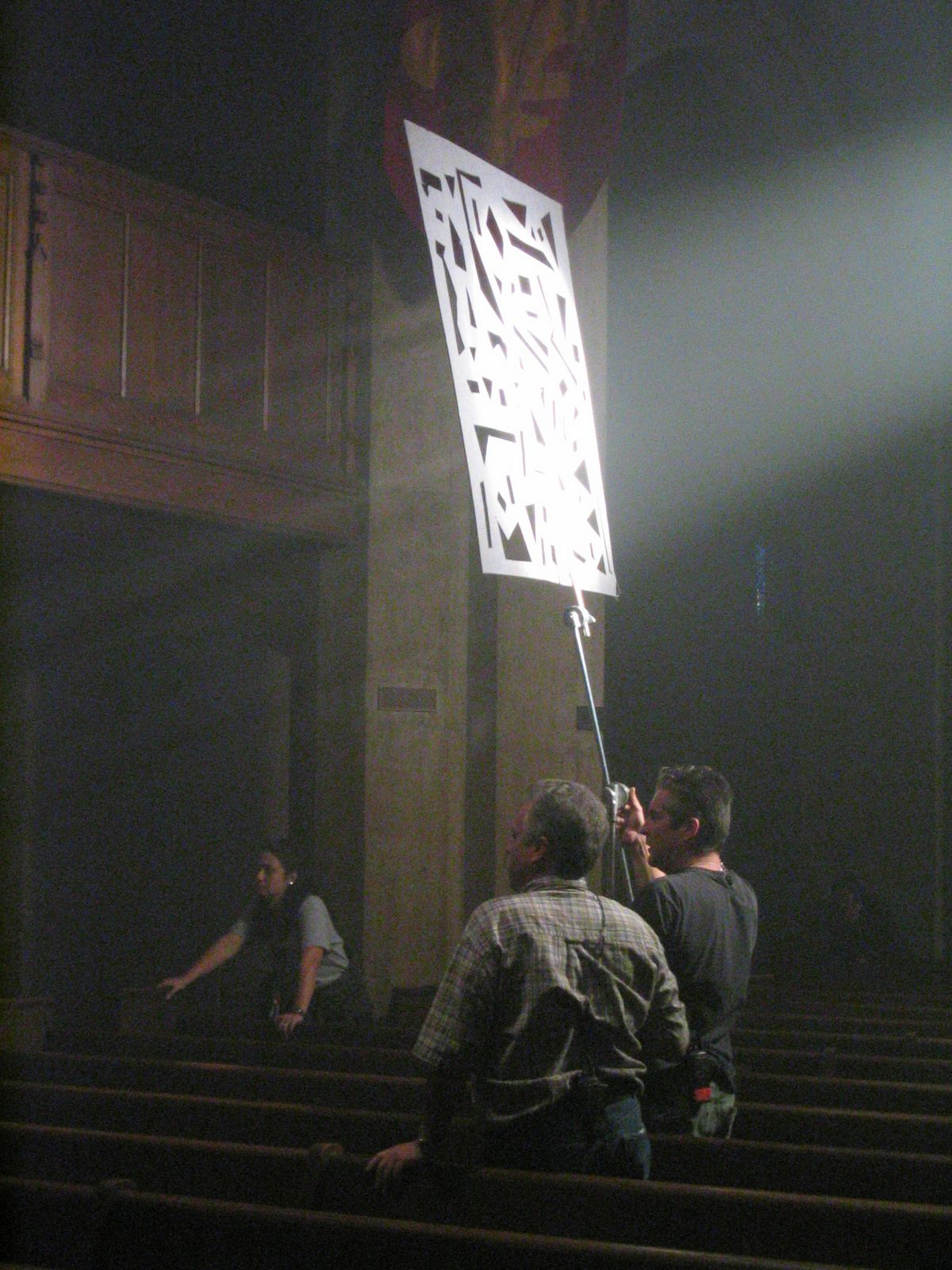
Crew members on National Treasure using a cookie

In lighting for film, theatre and still photography, a cucoloris (occasionally also spelled cuculoris, kookaloris, cookaloris or cucalorus) is a light modifier (tool, device) for casting shadows or silhouettes to produce patterned illumination. It is normally referred to as a cookie or sometimes as a kook or a coo-koo. The cucoloris is used to create a more natural look by breaking up the light from a man-made source. It can be used to simulate movement by passing shadows or light coming through a leafy canopy.

== Etymology ==
The etymology of the word is opaque, bearing a number of plausible origins. Grant Barett, a co-host of the radio show "A Way with Words", suggested that the phrase is an eponym of George Cukor. Moreover, a specious claim cited by "Directing and Producing Television" maintained that the term arose from the Greek kukaloris, breaking of light, loris conceivably cognate with luo, 'I break'. Another possibility is an origin in the German word Kokolores, which can mean "nonsense" or "boasting", like the English word Cockalorum.

== Overview ==
Generally, cookies fall into three groups: hard cookies, made from thin plywood or heavy poster board with random shapes cut out of the body; soft cookies (often called "celo" cookies), made from plastic impregnated screen (the same screen one might find in a storm window), also with random shapes cut or burned out; and brancholorises or dingles, which are simply tree limbs or other available things that can be placed between the light and the subject.

Many "old-school" grips would say that any unnatural pattern used to create a shadow is a cookie.

Cucolorises are sometimes thought of as a subset of the gobo category. Cucolorises differ from standard gobos in that they are used farther away from the lighting instrument, and therefore do not need to be as heat resistant. Cuculorises generally produce softer edges than gobos.

A similar technique to using a cookie is simulated in 3D computer graphics, where using an alpha map as a cookie (sometimes called a light texture) to cast shadows on 3D objects is simulated by applying an alpha texture to an emitting light source in the 3D scene, typically a spot light type or a directional light type, to serve as a virtual cookie that projects shadows onto 3D object(s) by emitting light only through the transparent or translucent parts of the alpha texture, thus simulating the effect of a cucoloris as used in its real-world counterpart. This effect is commonly used in both 3D computer-generated animation and video games.

== History ==
Cinematographer George J. Folsey, ASC thus recounted the history:

While shooting a scene with an actor who was wearing a white shirt, he wanted to separate the skin tones on the actor’s face from the hue of the shirt. Folsey told a grip to hold a stepladder in front of a key light to create a shadow on the actor’s shirt. The closer that the ladder was held to the light, the softer and less defined the shadow became. The grip eventually tired of holding the ladder, so he cut a grill with the same pattern in a sheet of light wood. One day, Folsey visited Hal Rosson, ASC, who was shooting on another set. In the scene, an actress was lying on a bed swathed in white sheets. Rosson used Folsey’s wooden grill to create some shadows, which made the scene more dramatic. Later, while shooting a similar situation, Rosson asked Folsey, “Where’s that kookaloris thing?”.

== See also ==
- Gobo (lighting)
