= Stage lighting =

Craft of lighting at performances

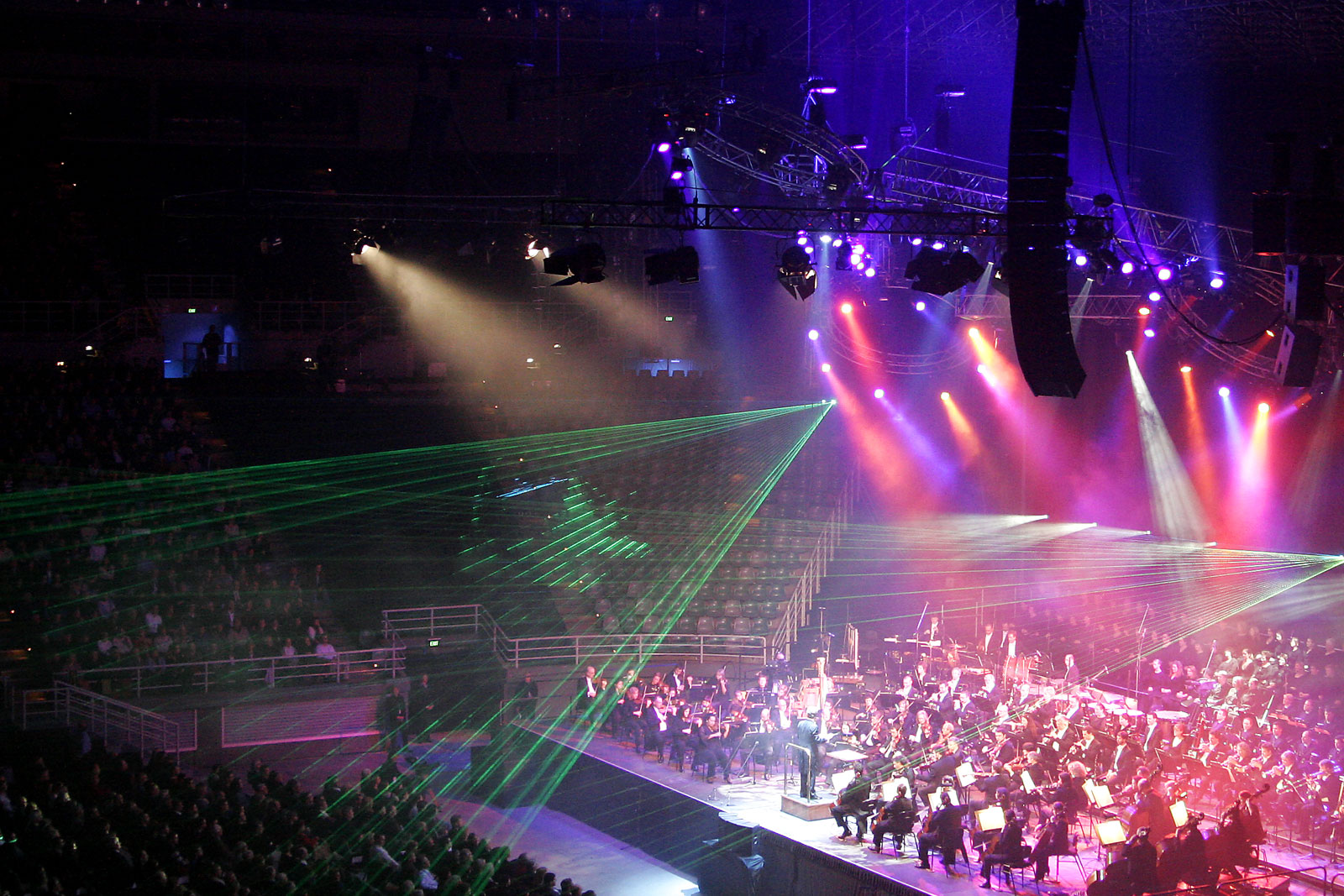
Classical Spectacular used ordinary stage lighting plus special laser effects

Stage lighting is the craft of lighting as it applies to the production of theater, dance, opera, and other performing arts. Several different types of stage lighting instruments are used in this discipline. In addition to basic lighting, modern stage lighting can also include special effects, such as lasers and fog machines. People who work on stage lighting are commonly referred to as lighting technicians or lighting designers.

The equipment used for stage lighting (e.g. cabling, dimmers, lighting instruments, controllers) are also used in other lighting applications, including corporate events, concerts, trade shows, broadcast television, film production, photographic studios, and other types of live events. The personnel needed to install, operate, and control the equipment also cross over into these different areas of "stage lighting" applications.

== History ==
The earliest known form of stage lighting occurred in Ancient Greek theaters, which were typically built outdoors and oriented so that afternoon sunlight illuminated the performance space while keeping the audience shaded. Natural light continued to be utilized when playhouses were built with a large circular opening at the top of the theater. As well as during the Middle Ages, many performances such as miracle and mystery plays were staged outdoors in church squares or on pageant wagons relying primarily on daylight rather than artificial lighting. Early Modern English theaters were roofless, allowing natural light to be utilized for lighting the stage. As theaters moved indoors, artificial lighting using candles and oil lamps supplemented the use of natural light via windows and shutters. Key developments in lighting technologies and practices were developed alongside the scenic stage in Italian Court Theatres by architect designers such as Bastiano da Sangallo (1481-1551), Sebastiano Serlio (1475-1554), Leone di Somi (1527-1592) and Angelo Ingegneri (1550-1613). Renaissance lighting techniques (including the use of darkness) were developed across Europe and detailed clearly in the writings of two architects, the Italian Nicola Sabbatini (1574-1654) and the German Joseph Furttenbach (1591-1667).

In England following the Civil War all stage production was suspended in 1642 and no advancements were made to English theaters. During this theatrical famine, great developments were being made in theaters on the European mainland. Charles II, who would later become King Charles II witnessed Italian theatrical methods and brought them back to England when he came to power. New playhouses were built in England and their large sizes called for more elaborate lighting. After the refurbishing of the theaters, it was found that the "main source of light in Restoration theaters to be chandeliers" which were "concentrated toward the front of the house, and especially over the forestage". English theatres during this time used dipped candles to light chandeliers and sconces. Dipped candles were made by dipping a wick into hot wax repeatedly to create a cylindrical candle. Candles needed frequent trimming and relighting regardless of what was happening on-stage because "they dripped hot grease on both the audience and actors". Chandeliers also blocked the view of some patrons.

In the eastern world, shadow plays relied heavily on lighting to transform the story of the show because, as implied in the name, they utilized shadows to change the shapes of the characters/puppets, using the distance of the lights from the puppets to change the shape or size of the shadow.

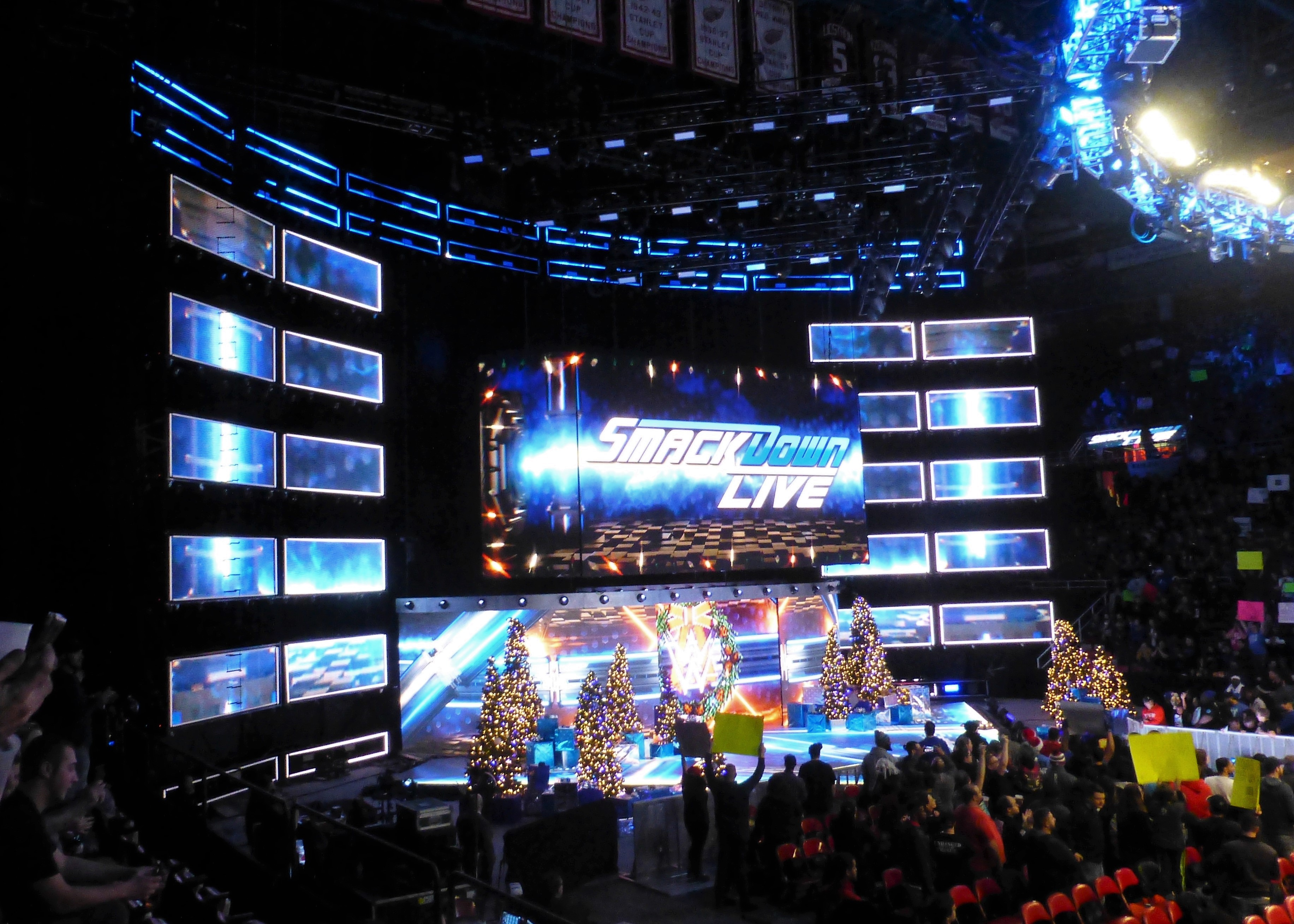
An example of stage lighting, trusses and LED walls are used during a WWE SmackDown Live televised professional wrestling show.

There were two different types of Restoration theaters in England: commercial theaters and court theaters. Commercial theaters tended to be more "conservative in their lighting, for economic reasons" and therefore used "candle-burning chandeliers" primarily. Court theatres could afford to "use most of the Continental innovations" in their productions. Theaters such as the Drury Lane Theatre and the Covent Garden Theatre were lit by a large central chandelier and had a varying number of smaller stage chandeliers and candle sconces around the walls of the theaters. Two main court theaters, built between 1660 and 1665, were the Cockpit Theatre and the Hall Theatre. Chandeliers and sconces seemed to be the primary lighting sources here but other developments were being made, especially at the Hall. By the 1670s, the Hall Theatre started using footlights, and between 1670 and 1689 they used candles or lamps. It can be noted that by the end of the 17th century, "French and English stages were fairly similar". There is not much written on theatrical lighting in England at the end of the 17th century and from the little information historians do have, not much changed by the middle of the 18th century. Gas lighting began appearing in English theaters in the early 19th century including installations at Drury Lane and Covent Garden. These systems utilized coal gas piped through valves and pipes. that could be controlled from a gas table, an early form of centralized lighting control. In the 1820's limelight was developed producing intense illumination by directing a flame at a cylinder of calcium oxide (quicklime) which became incandescent and emitted a bright white light. This illumination could then be directed by reflectors and lenses. Lime light was first used for theatrical lighting at Covent garden theatre in London in 1837 and became widely adopted in theaters by the 1860's. until it was displaced by electrical lighting. Electric lighting began replacing gas lighting in theaters in the late nineteenth century. one of the earliest examples was the Savoy Theatre in London which in 1881 became the first theatre illuminated entirely by electric light. Early electric stage lighting systems used salt water dimmers, which controlled brightness by adjusting electrical resistance in a container of salt water. These systems were widely used in theatres before modern electronic dimmers. Lighting innovations developed in English theaters during the nineteenth century helped establish many of the technologies used in modern lighting.

== Functions of lighting ==
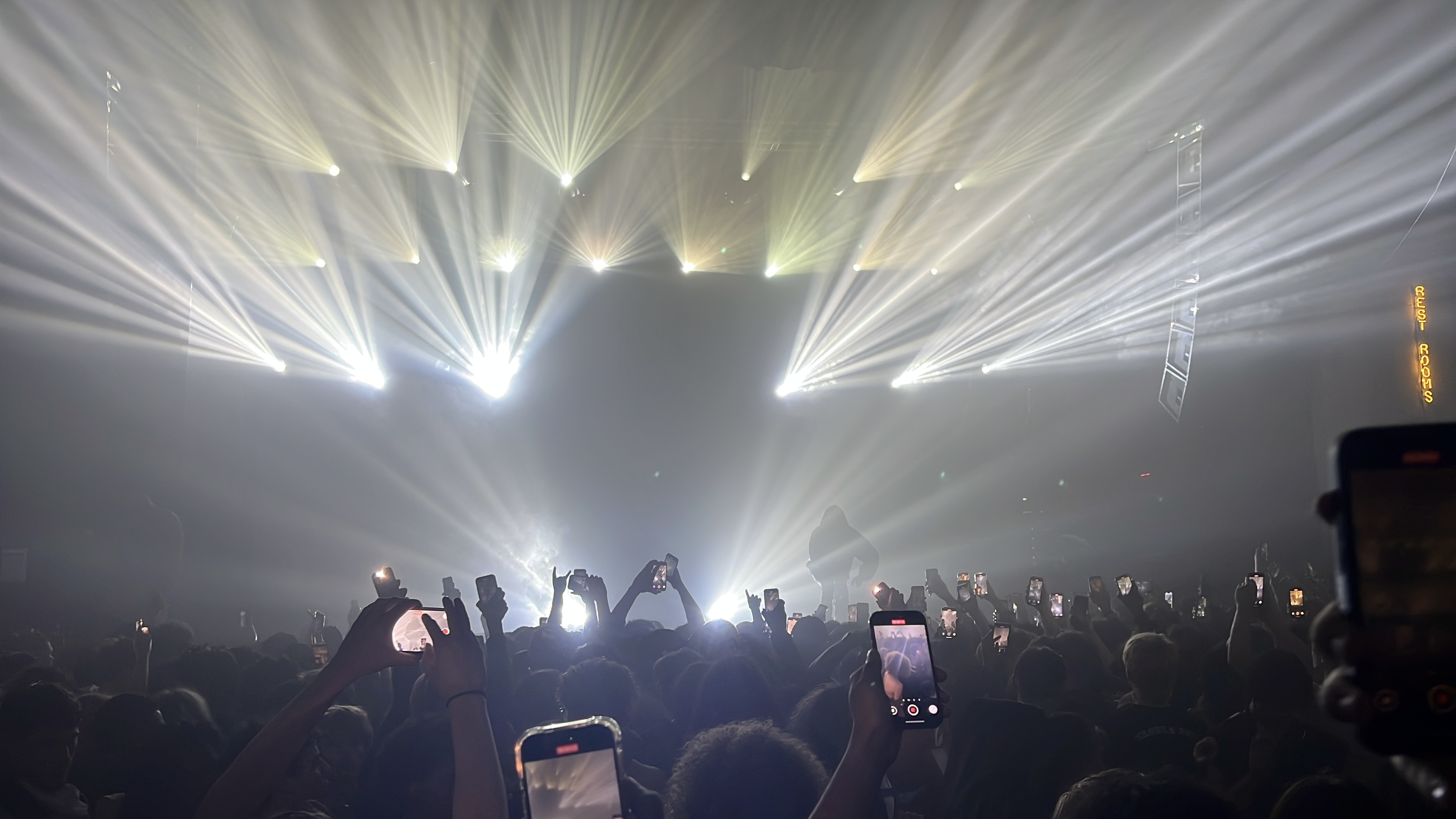
Intense lighting effects during a performance by rapper OsamaSon in 2025.

Stage lighting has multiple functions, including:

- Selective visibility: The ability to see what is occurring on stage. Any lighting design will be ineffective if the viewers cannot see the characters, unless this is the explicit intent.
- Revelation of form: Altering the perception of shapes onstage, particularly three-dimensional stage elements.
- Focus: Directing the audience's attention to an area of the stage or distracting them from another.
- Mood: Setting the tone of a scene. Harsh red light has a different effect than soft lavender light.
- Location and time of day: Establishing or altering position in time and space. Blues can suggest night time while orange and red can suggest a sunrise or sunset. Use of mechanical filters ("gobos") to project sky scenes, the Moon, etc.
- Projection/stage elements: Lighting may be used to project scenery or to act as scenery onstage.
- Plot (script): A lighting event may trigger or advance the action onstage and off.
- Composition: Lighting may be used to show only the areas of the stage which the designer wants the audience to see, and to "paint a picture".
- Effect: In pop and rock concerts or DJ shows or raves, colored lights and lasers may be used as a visual effect.

Lighting design is an art form, and thus no one way is the "correct" way. There is a modern movement that states that the lighting design helps to create the environment in which the action takes place while supporting the style of the piece. "Mood" is arguable while the environment is essential.

== Qualities in lighting ==
=== Intensity ===
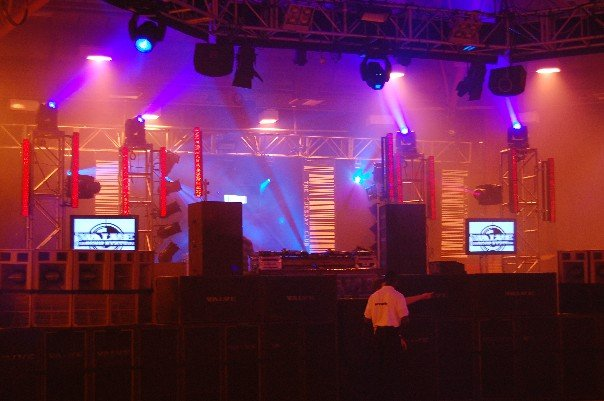
An example of a rig including moving head, generic and LED fixtures at 'The Tuesday Club'

Intensity is measured in lux, lumens and foot-candles. The intensity of a luminaire (lighting instrument or fixture) depends on a number of factors including its lamp power, the design of the instrument (and its efficiency), optical obstructions such as color gels or mechanical filters, the distance to the area to be lit and the beam or field angle of the fixture, the color and material to be lit, and the relative contrasts to other regions of illumination.

=== Color ===
Color temperature is measured in kelvins. A light's apparent color is determined by its lamp color, the color of any gels in the optical path, its power level, and the color of the material it lights.

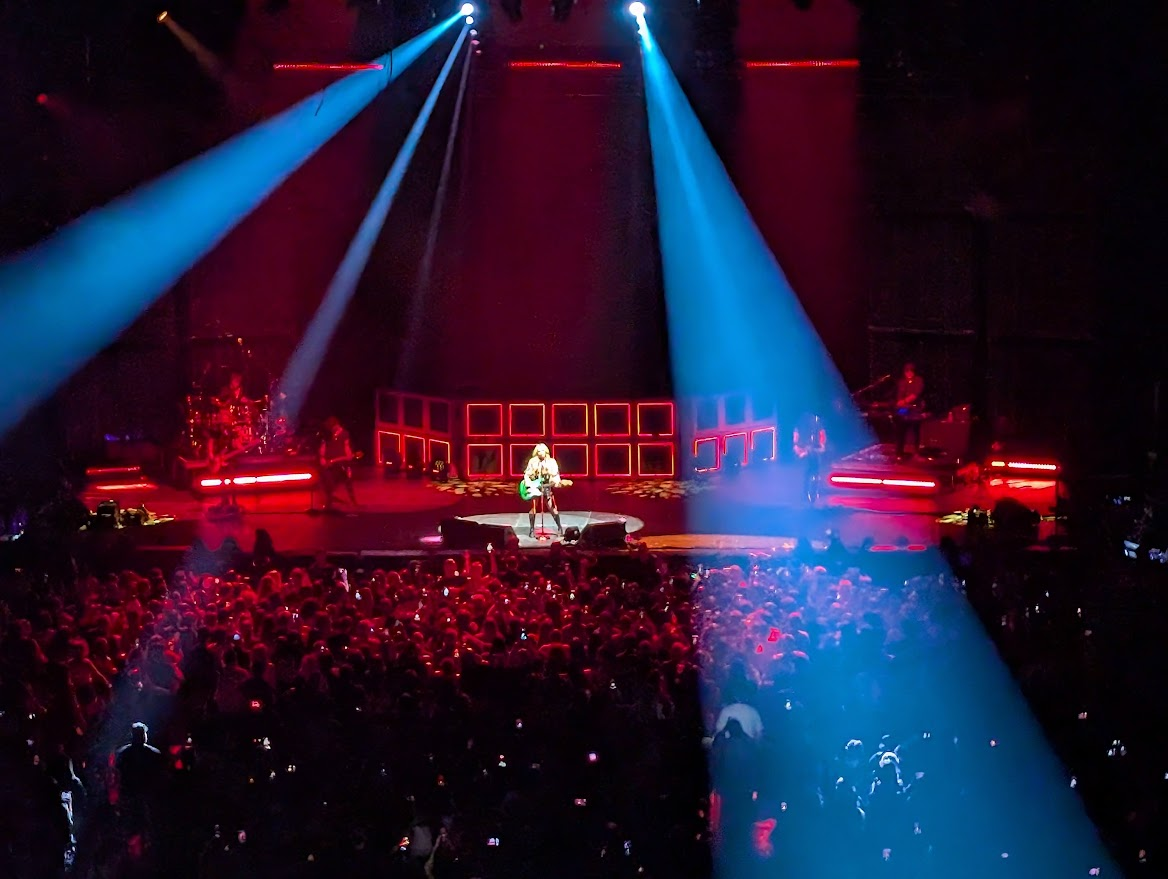
Coloured lighting at an Avril Lavigne concert at Canada Life Place

A tungsten lamp's color is typically controlled by inserting one or more gels (filters) into its optical path. In the simplest case, a single gel is inserted into the optical path to produce light of the same color. For example, a blue gel is used to create blue light. Custom colors are obtained by means of subtractive CMY color mixing, by inserting combinations of cyan, magenta and yellow filters into the optical path of the lighting fixture. The inserted filters may have varying densities, with correspondingly varied percentages of transmission, that subtractively mix colors (the filters absorb unwanted light colors, but the desired colors pass through unaffected). Manufacturers will sometimes include an additional green or amber ("CTO" color correction) filter to extend the range (gamut) of subtractive color mixing systems.

Lamp power also influences color in tungsten lamps. As the lamp power is decreased, the tungsten filament in a bulb will tend to produce increasing percentages of orange light, as compared to the nearly white light emitted at full power. This is known as amber shift or amber drift. Thus a 1000-watt instrument at 50 percent power will emit a higher percentage of orange light than a 500-watt instrument operating at full power.

LED fixtures create color through additive color mixing with red, green, blue, and in some cases amber, LEDs at different intensities. This type of color mixing is often used with borderlights and cyclorama lights.

=== Direction ===
A gobo of this shape in a fixture with a red gel would produce a pattern like the one shown to the right.

Direction refers to the shape, quality and evenness of a lamp's output. The pattern of light an instrument makes is largely determined by three factors. The first are the specifics of the lamp, reflector and lens assembly. Different mounting positions for the lamp (axial, base up, base down), different sizes and shapes of reflector and the nature of the lens (or lenses) being used can all affect the pattern of light. Secondly, the specifics of how the lamp is focused affect its pattern. In ellipsoidal reflector spotlights (ERS) or profile spotlights, there are two beams of light emitted from the lamp. When the cones of both intersect at the throw distance (the distance to the stage), the lamp has a sharply defined 'hard' edge. When the two cones do not intersect at that distance, the edge is fuzzy and 'soft'. Depending on which beam (direct or reflected) is outside the other, the pattern may be 'thin and soft' or 'fat and soft'. Lastly, a gobo or break up pattern may be applied to ERSs and similar instruments. This is typically a thin sheet of metal with a shape cut into it. It is inserted into the instrument near its aperture. Gobos, or templates, come in many shapes, but often include leaves, waves, stars and similar patterns.

=== Focus, position, and hanging ===
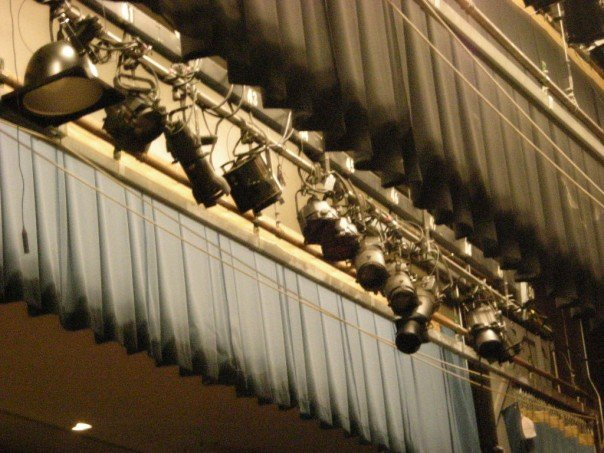
Many stage lights hang on a batten focused in several directions

The focus is where an instrument is pointed. The final focus should place the "hot spot" of the beam at the actor's head level when standing at the center of the instrument's assigned "focus area" on the stage. Position refers to the location of an instrument in the theater's fly system or on permanent pipes in front-of-house locations. Hanging is the act of placing the instrument in its assigned position.

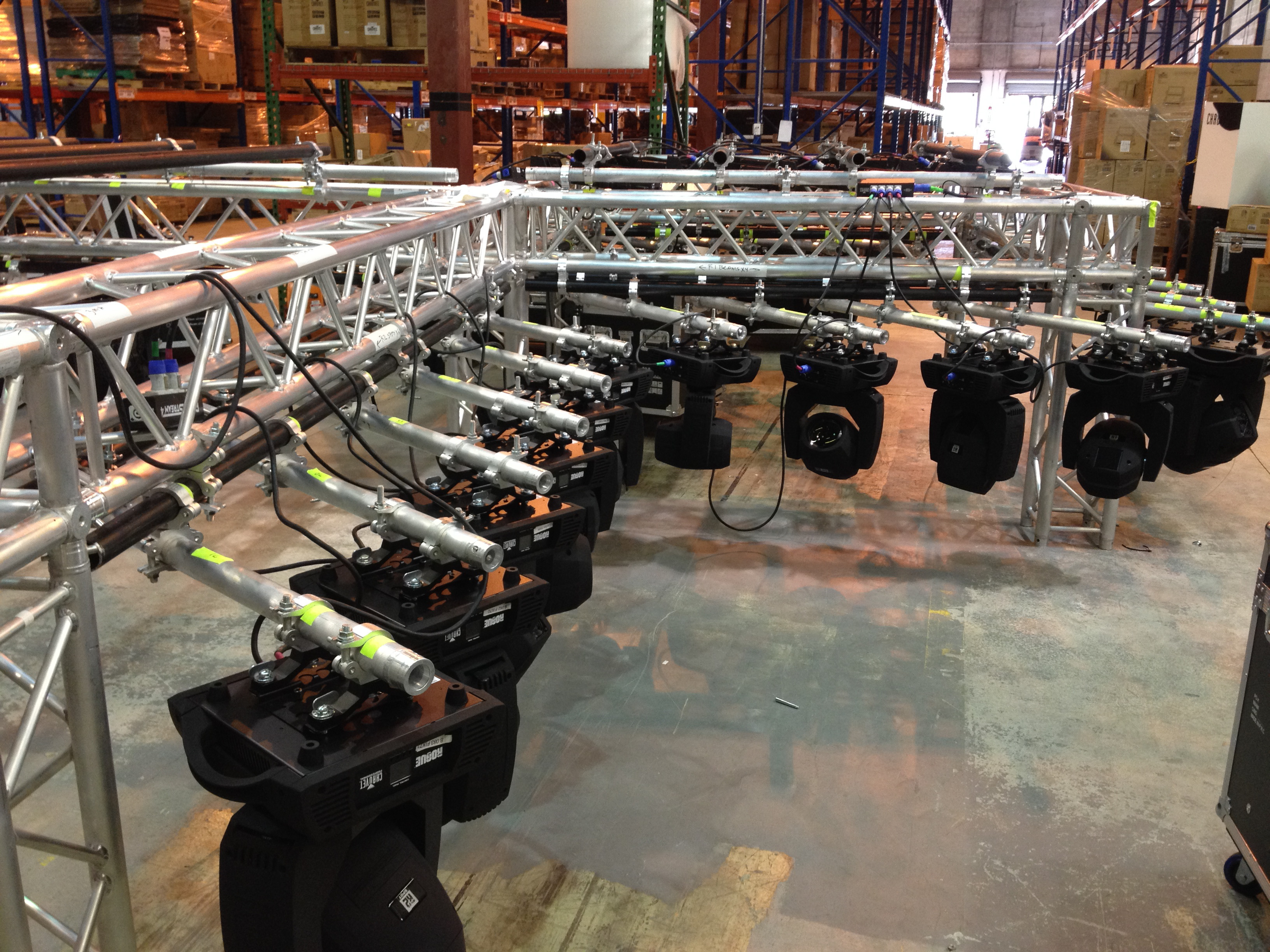
Moving lights hanging on a truss, ready for rigging and chain motors.

In addition to these, certain modern instruments are automated, referring to motorized movement of either the entire fixture body or the movement of a mirror placed in front of its outermost lens. These fixtures and the more traditional follow spots add direction and motion to the relevant characteristics of light. Automated fixtures fall into either the "moving head" or "moving mirror/scanner" category. Scanners have a body which contains the lamp, circuit boards, transformer, and effects (color, gobo, iris etc.) devices. A mirror is panned and tilted in the desired position by pan and tilt motors, thereby causing the light beam to move. Moving head fixtures have the effects and lamp assembly inside the head with transformers and other electronics in the base or external ballast. There are advantages and disadvantages to both. Scanners are typically faster and less costly than moving head units but have a narrower range of movement. Moving head fixtures have a much larger range of movement as well as a more natural inertial movement but are typically more expensive.

The above characteristics are not always static, and it is frequently the variation in these characteristics that is used in achieving the goals of lighting.

Stanley McCandless was perhaps the first to define controllable qualities of light used in theater. In A Method for Lighting the Stage, McCandless discusses color, distribution, intensity and movement as the qualities that can be manipulated by a lighting designer to achieve the desired visual, emotional and thematic look on stage. The McCandless method, outlined in that book, is widely embraced today. The method involves lighting an object on the stage from three angles—2 lights at 45 degrees to the left and right, and one at 90 degrees (perpendicular to the front of the object).

An alternative formulation is by Jody Briggs, who calls them Variable of Light: Angle, Color, Intensity, Distance, Texture, Edge-quality, Size, and Shape.

== Lighting professionals ==
=== Lighting designer ===
A lighting designer (LD) is familiar with the various types of lighting instruments and their uses. In consultation with the director, the DSM (deputy stage manager) and the scenic designer, and after observing rehearsals, the LD creates an instrument schedule and a light plot as well as informing the DSM where each LX (lighting) cue is designed to be triggered in the script, which the DSM notes down in their plot book. The schedule is a list of all required lighting equipment, including color gel, gobos, color wheels, barndoors and other accessories. The light plot is typically a plan view of the theatre where the performance will take place, with every luminaire marked. This typically specifies the approximate lighting focus and direction, a reference number, accessories, the address number (assigned DMX addresses) in the dimmer system and channel on the lighting control console.

A lighting designer must satisfy the requirements set forth by the director or head planner. Practical experience is required to know the effective use of different lighting instruments and color in creating a design. Many designers start their careers as lighting technicians. Often, this is followed by training in a vocational college or university that offers theatre courses. Many jobs in larger venues and productions require a degree from a vocational school or college in theatrical lighting, or at least a bachelor's degree.

=== Other positions ===
In theater:

- Master electrician/chief electrician
- Production electrician
- Lighting programmer
- Lighting operator/light board operator

In film:

- Best boy (electrical)
- Gaffer

== Lighting equipment ==
=== Lighting instruments ===
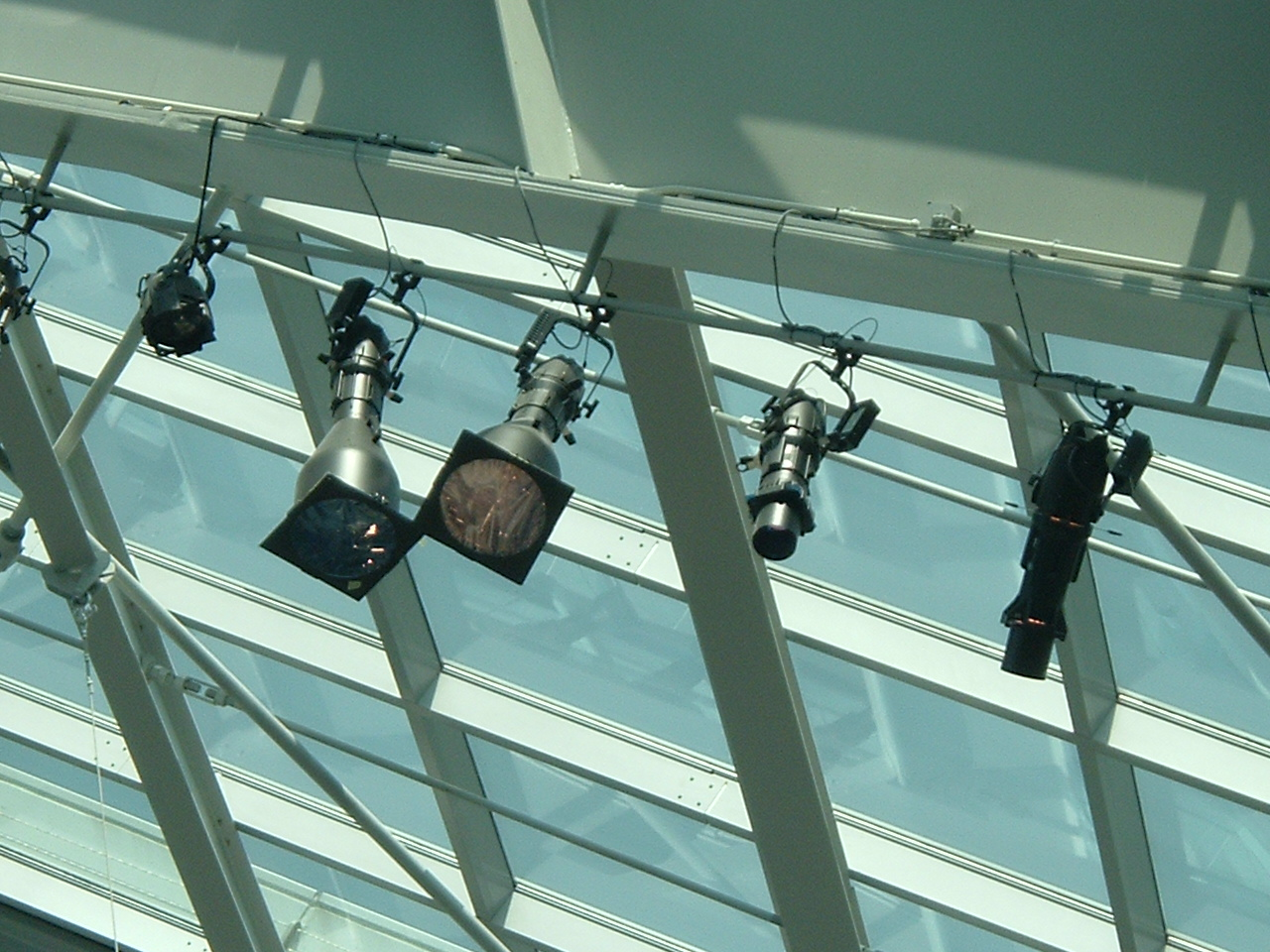
Source Fours in use at the United States Marine Corps Museum

In the context of lighting design, a lighting instrument (also called a luminaire or lantern) is a device that produces controlled lighting as part of the effects a lighting designer brings to a show. The term lighting instrument is preferred to light to avoid confusion between light and light sources.

There are a variety of instruments frequently used in the theater. Although they vary in many ways they all have the following four basic components in one form or other:

- Box/Housing – a metal or plastic container to house the whole instrument and prevent light from spilling in unwanted directions.
- Light source (lamp).
- Lens or opening – the gap in the housing where the light is intended to come out.
- Reflector – behind or around the light source in such a way as to direct more light towards the lens or opening.

Additional features will vary depending on the exact type of fixture.

Most theatrical light bulbs (or lamps, the term usually preferred) are tungsten-halogen (or quartz-halogen), an improvement on the original incandescent design that uses a halogen gas instead of an inert gas to increase lamp life and output. Fluorescent lights are infrequently used other than as worklights because, although they are far more efficient, they are expensive to make dimmed (run at less than full power) without using specialised dimmer ballasts and only very expensive models will dim to very low levels. They also do not produce light from a single point or easily concentrated area, and usually have a warm-up period, during which they emit no light or do so intermittently. However, fluorescent lights are being used more and more for special effects lighting in theaters. High-intensity discharge lamps (or HID lamps), however, are now common where a very bright light output is required—for example in large follow spots, hydrargyrum medium-arc iodide (HMI) floods, and modern automated fixtures. When dimming is required, it is done by mechanical dousers or shutters, as these types of lamps also cannot be electrically dimmed.

Since the early 2000's, LED (Light emitting diode) Instruments has become increasingly common in theatre and concert production. LED fixtures consume less energy than traditional incandescent or halogen lamps and can produce a wide range of colors without the need for gel filters.

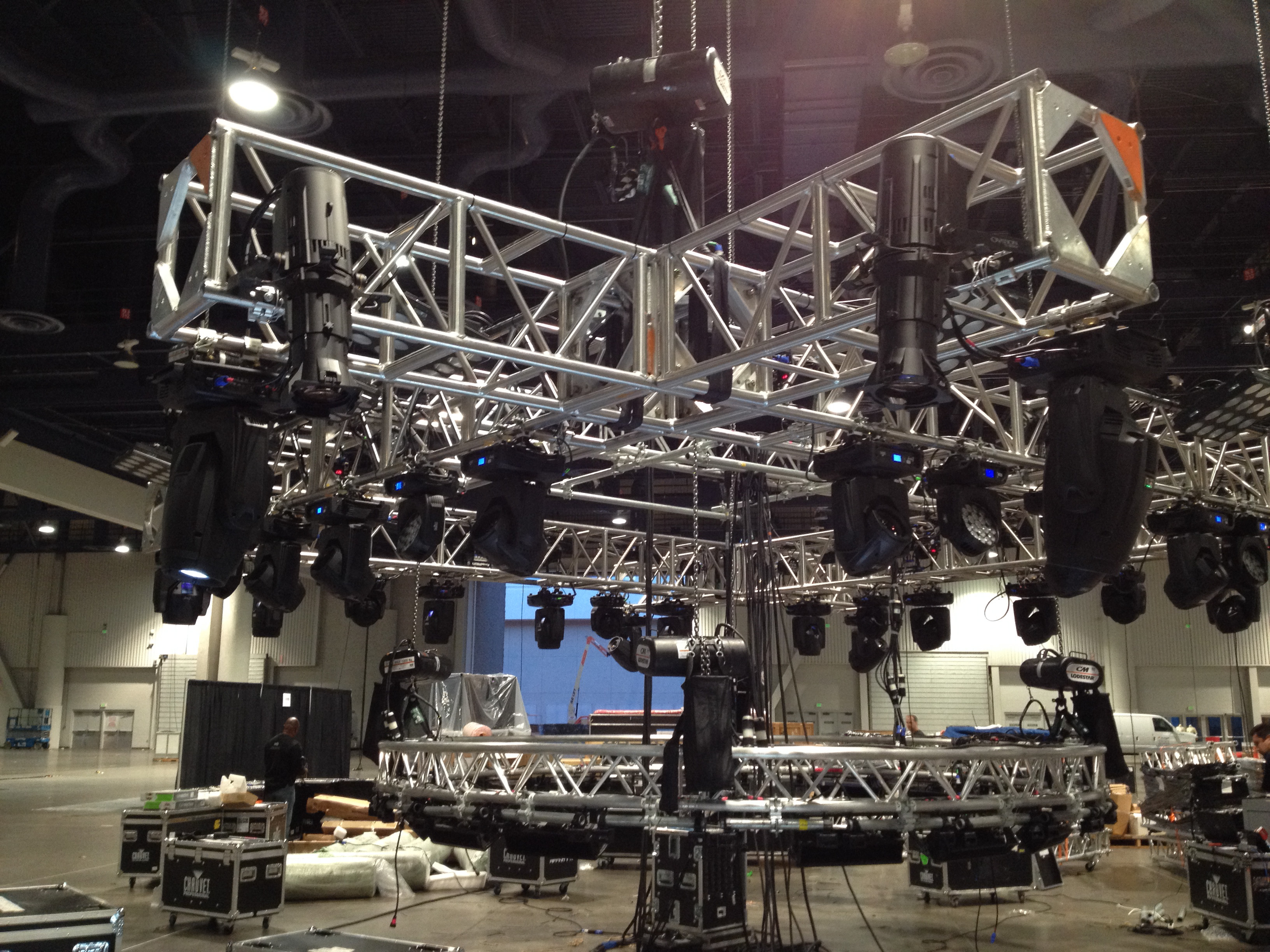
Ovation E-190WW LED ellipsoidal spots (ERS) hanging on 20.5" truss.

Most instruments are suspended or supported by a U-shaped yoke, or 'trunnion arm' fixed to the sides of the instrument, normally near its center of gravity. On the end of such, a clamp (known as a hook-clamp, C-clamp, or pipe clamp—pipe referring to battens) is normally fixed, made in a "C" configuration with a screw to lock the instrument onto the pipe or batten from which it is typically hung. Once secured, the fixture can be panned and tilted using tension adjustment knobs on the yoke and clamp. An adjustable c-wrench, ratchet (US) or spanner (UK) is often used to assist the technician in adjusting the fixture.

Most venues require an additional metal safety cable or chain to be attached between the fixture and its truss, or other string support anchorage. Some larger fixtures can weigh over 100 lb (45 kg) and are suspended very high above performers heads, and could cause serious injury or death if they fell by accident or due to incorrect attachment. In the event of failure, the cable would halt the fall of the fixture before it could cause serious damage or injury. Many venues place strict guidelines regarding the use of safety cables.

The entire lighting apparatus includes the lights themselves, the physical structure which supports them, the cabling, control systems, dimmers, power supplies, and the light boards. (lighting console)

Hanging the lights or hanging the battons to hang the lights is known as 'rigging'.

=== Types of lighting fixture ===
All lights are loosely classified as either floodlights (wash lights) or spotlights. The distinction has to do with the degree to which one is able to control the shape and quality of the light produced by the instrument, with spotlights being controllable, sometimes to an extremely precise degree, and floodlights being completely uncontrollable. Instruments that fall somewhere in the middle of the spectrum can be classified as either a spot or a flood, depending on the type of instrument and how it is used. In general, spotlights have lenses while floodlights are lensless, although this is not always the case.

Within the groups of "wash" and "spot" light, there are other, more specific types of fixtures. This nomenclature also changes across the world depending on location and industry.

Profile
These fixtures feature a compound lens which allows the designer to place obstructions within the image path which are then projected. These obstructions could be "gobos" or shutters. A profile is a spot light, but allows for precise focusing. This term is mostly used in the United Kingdom, Australia, and Europe, as profile spots in the United States and Canada are referred to as ERS, ellipsoidals, or just Lekos, from the original Lekolite created by Joseph Levy and Edward Kook, founders of Century Lighting, in 1933.

Fresnel
A Fresnel or Fresnel lantern is a type of wash light and is named as such due to the Fresnel lens it features as the final optical device within the chain.

Traditionally theatre and stage lighting has been of the "generic" type. These are lights which are focussed, geled, and then simply dimmed to give the effect the designer wants. In recent years the emergence of moving lights (or automated lights) has had a substantial impact of theatre and stage lighting.

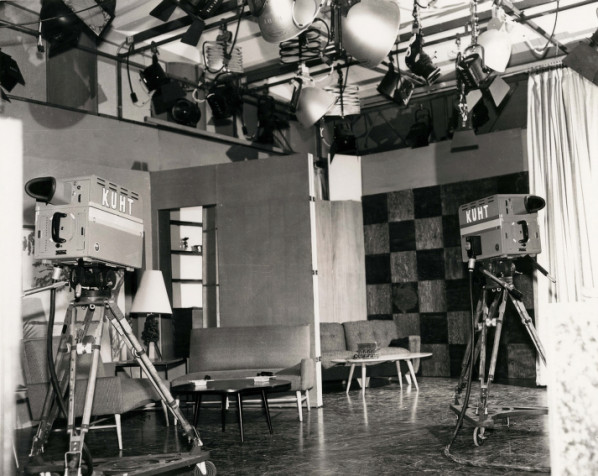
Stage lighting

A typical moving light allows the designer to control the position, color, shape, size and strobing of the light beam created. This can be used for exciting effects for the entertainment or dancefloor use. Moving lights are also often used instead of having a large number of "generic" lights. This is because one moving light can do the work of several generics.

In Australia and many other places, the lamps inside a theatrical fixture are referred to as bubbles. In North American English, a bubble refers to the protrusion that occurs when one's body (or other oily substance) contacts the lamp. Heat will cause the portion of the lamp which has oil on it to expand when it is on creating the bubble, and causing the lamp to explode. That is why one should never directly touch the glass portion of a lamp. Cleaning with rubbing alcohol will remove the oil.

== Lighting controls ==
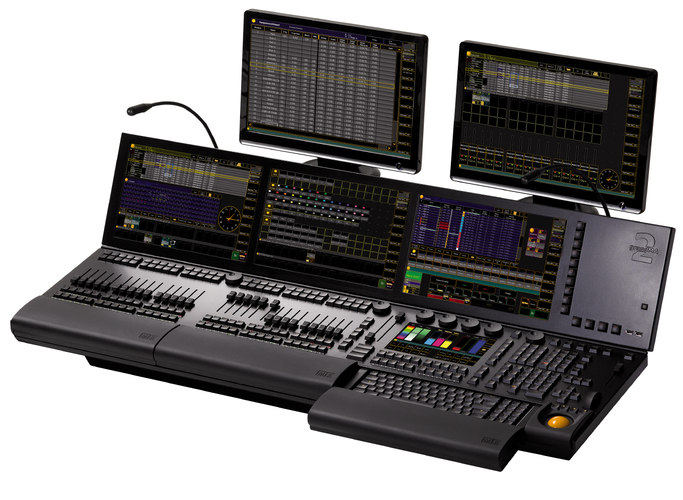
MA Lighting's grandMA2 Full Size console

Lighting control tools might best be described as anything that changes the quality of the light. Historically this has been done by the use of intensity control. Technological advancements have made intensity control relatively simple - solid state dimmers are controlled by one or more lighting controllers. Controllers are commonly lighting consoles designed for sophisticated control over very large numbers of dimmers or luminaires, but may be simpler devices which play back stored sequences of lighting states with minimal user interfaces. Consoles are also referred to as lighting desks or light-boards.

For larger shows or installations, multiple consoles are sometimes used together and in some cases lighting controllers are combined or coordinated with controllers for sound, automated scenery, pyrotechnics and other effects to provide total automation of the entire show, using a specific branch of MIDI technology called MSC (MIDI show control). See show control.

The lighting controller is connected to the dimmers (or directly to automated luminaires) using a control cable or wireless link (e.g. DMX512) or network, allowing the dimmers which are bulky, hot and sometimes noisy, to be positioned away from the stage and audience and allowing automated luminaires to be positioned wherever necessary. In addition to DMX512, newer control connections include RDM (remote device management) which adds management and status feedback capabilities to devices which use it while maintaining compatibility with DMX512; and Architecture for Control Networks (ACN) which is a fully featured multiple controller networking protocol. These allow the possibility of feedback of position, state or fault conditions from units, whilst allowing much more detailed control of them.

=== Dimming ===
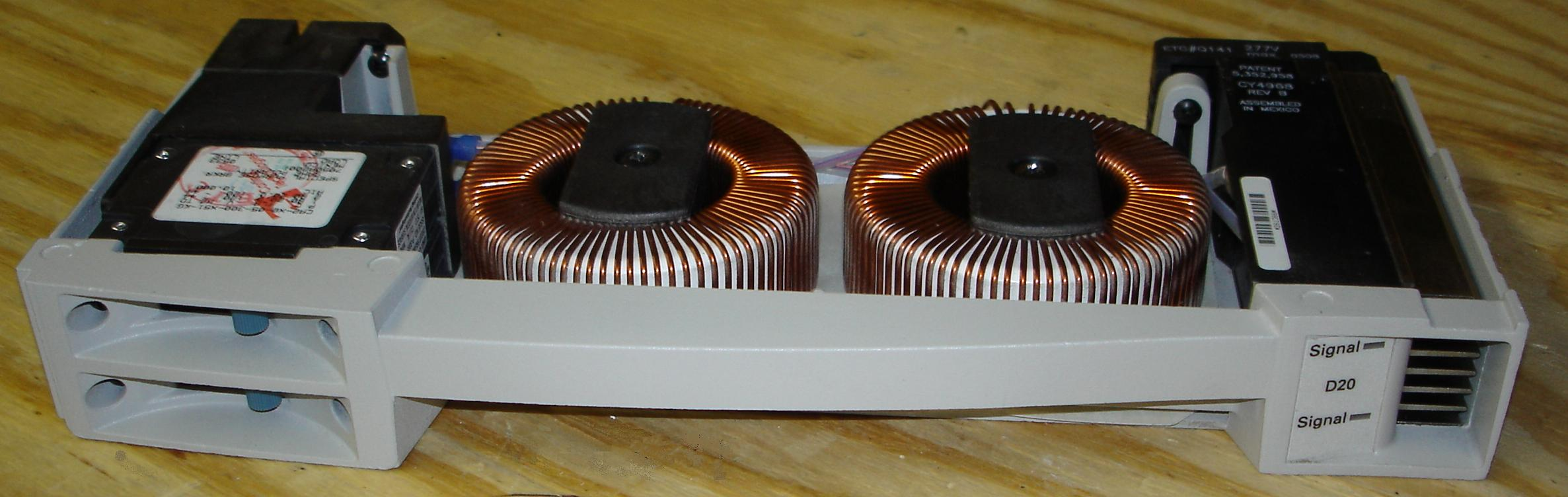
A pair of electronic 2.4 kW dimmers for tungsten incandescent lamps

A dimmer is a device used to vary the average voltage applied to an instrument's lamp. The brightness of a lamp depends on its electric current, which in turn depends on the applied lamp voltage. When the applied voltage is decreased, a lamp's electric current will also decrease, thus reducing the light output from the lamp (dimming it). Conversely, a higher voltage will cause higher lamp current and increased (brighter) light output. Dimmers are frequently found in large enclosures called racks or dimmer racks that draw significant three-phase power. They are often removable modules that range from 20-ampere, 2.4-kilowatt to 100-ampere units.

In the case of incandescent lamps, some color changes occur as a lamp is dimmed, allowing for a limited amount of color control through a dimmer. Fades (brightness transitions) can be either UP or DOWN, meaning that the light output is increasing or decreasing during the transition. Most modern dimmers are solid state, though many mechanical dimmers are still in operation.

In many cases, a dimmer can be replaced by a constant power module (CPM), which is typically a 20- or 50-ampere breaker in a dimming module casing. CPMs are used to supply line voltage to non-dimming electrical devices such as smoke machines, chain winches, and scenic motors that require constant operating voltage. When a device is powered by a CPM, it is fully energized whenever the CPM is turned on, independent of lighting console levels. CPMs must be used (in lieu of dimmers) to power non-dimming devices that require specific line voltages (e.g. in the US, 120 V, 60 Hz power) in order to avoid damage to such devices. Dimmers are seldom used to control non-dimming devices because even if a dimmer channel is trusted to always operate at full power, it may not be controlled when communications are disrupted by start up and shut down of the lighting control surface, noise interference, or DMX disconnects or failure. Such a loss of control might cause a dimmer to dim a circuit and thus potentially damage its non-dimming device.

Devices like moving heads also require independent power, as they cannot function on a partially dimmed channel for power, on top of requiring several other channels in order to convey all of the data they require for their several features. In order to simplify the control of moving head lanterns, instead of assigning channels manually to the lantern, many desks also offer a fixtures section, where one can assign the lantern as a fixture, allowing the desk to organise the data being transferred to the lantern on a much simpler scale for the operator. Fixtures may also incorporate smoke machines, snow machines, haze machines etc., allowing many special effects to be run from a single desk.

Increasingly, modern lighting instruments are available which allow remote control of effects other than light intensity, including direction, color, beam shape, projected image, and beam angle. The ability to move an instrument ever more quickly and quietly is an industry goal. Some automated lights have built-in dimming and so are connected directly to the control cable or network and are independent of external dimmers.

== See also ==
- DJ lighting
- Gas lighting
- High-key lighting
- Low-key lighting
- Tree lights
