= Gobo (lighting) =

Template placed in front of a light source to shape the emitted light

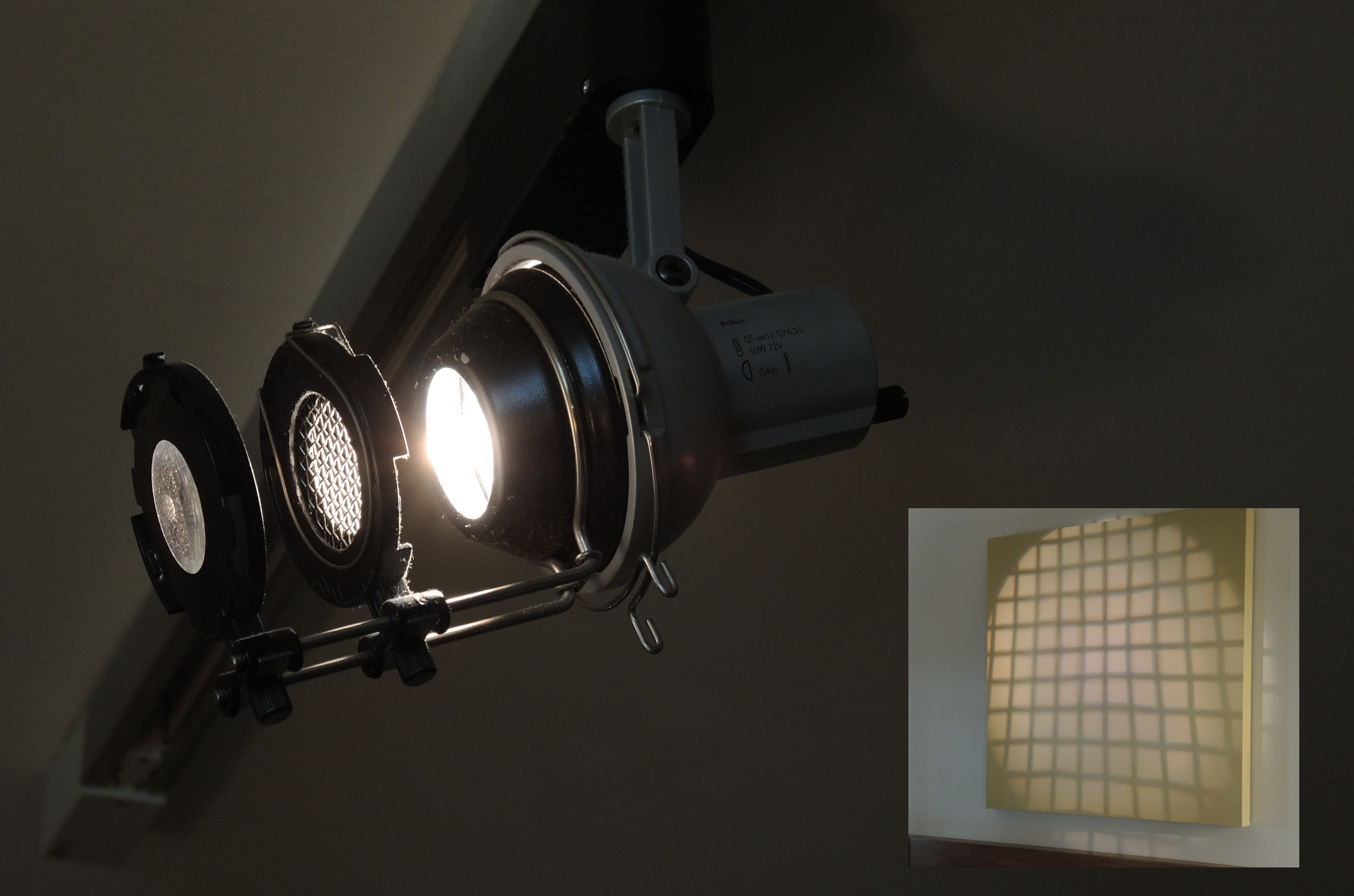
A decorative lighting device that projects a gobo. Components from right to left are the lamp house, the gobo itself (in this case a grid made of wires), and the focusing lens. In a theatrical unit, all three would be in an enclosure to prevent light spillage. The insert at lower right shows the pattern this device projects. The spacing of the gobo and the lens can be varied to alter the size and focus of the image.

A gobo is an object placed inside or in front of a light source to control the shape of the emitted light and its shadow. For studio photography purposes, the term gobo has come to refer to any device that casts a shadow, and various pieces of equipment that go in front of a light (such as a gobo arm or gobo head). In theatrical lighting, however, the term more specifically refers to a device placed in "the gate" or at the "point of focus" between the light source, called a lamp, and the lenses (or other optics).

== Derivation ==
The term was originally a shortened version of "Go Between" for Thomas Alva Edison's phonograph recording process as a way to moderate sound levels when recording to wax cylinders. Eventually some of the people who helped the Edison company with recordings also worked in the Edison film studio and put patterns between their new electric lights and scenery while shooting film scenes, and "gobo" was appropriated for lighting since the pattern "goes between" the light and the scenery. It appears to have become standard use in cinema studios in the 1930s.

Some lighting professionals believe it is an acronym for "goes before optics" or, less often, "goes between optics". An alternative abbreviation might be "graphical optical black-out". The treatment of the word as an acronym is recent.

== Use in studio photography ==
In the photographic industry, a "gobo" describes any opaque, usually black, panel, or "flat", of any dimension, that goes between a light source and photographic subject (such as between sun light and a portrait model) to control the modelling effect of the existing light or, used as a "cutter", to create shadows; or even to control reflections; or between light source and lens, to cut flare. Use of gobos augments light-shaping devices attached to the lights themselves, whether continuous or flash, with cones, snoots, honeycomb grids or barn doors being the most common such fittings.

=== Subtractive ===
The use of the gobo is "subtractive", as opposed to using a "reflector" to bounce added light into a shadow (thus "additive" lighting). Use of a gobo subtracts light from a portion of an overall shaded subject and creates a contrast between one side of the subject and the other.

==== Equipment ====
For long shoots on complex sets in the studio more convenient and precise are free-standing boards, often configured as self-supporting hinged door-height panels (usually called "flats"), or if smaller, as a "flag", or a "dot" (a round flag), or a "finger" (larger and rectangular in form) attached to stands, or extending from arms or clamps attached to the tabletop for still-life and product shots. Photographers most often use panels of black foamcore or thick cards. All are devised, or improvised, in different shapes, but are always opaque. The closer the gobo is to the subject, the sharper the shadow. Patent arms with "elbows" that can be oriented in all planes and that can be locked in position are commercially available.

=== Blocking/reducing light ===
The term is also used for panels or screens used to block light from the lens that would otherwise cause flare or degrade contrast. Such screens as used on films sets may be 3 m (9.8 ft) tall. The photographer on location might use their lens hood, hand or dark slide for such purpose, but with multiple light sources in the studio a range of separate operable gobos provides tailored solutions.

A gobo may be used even in the case of broad-source light (a softbox, for example) where the problem is to control reflection in a metallic or glass surface, by placing it in front of the diffuser for a hard-edged dark reflection, or behind, to produce a soft outline.

== Use in theatre ==
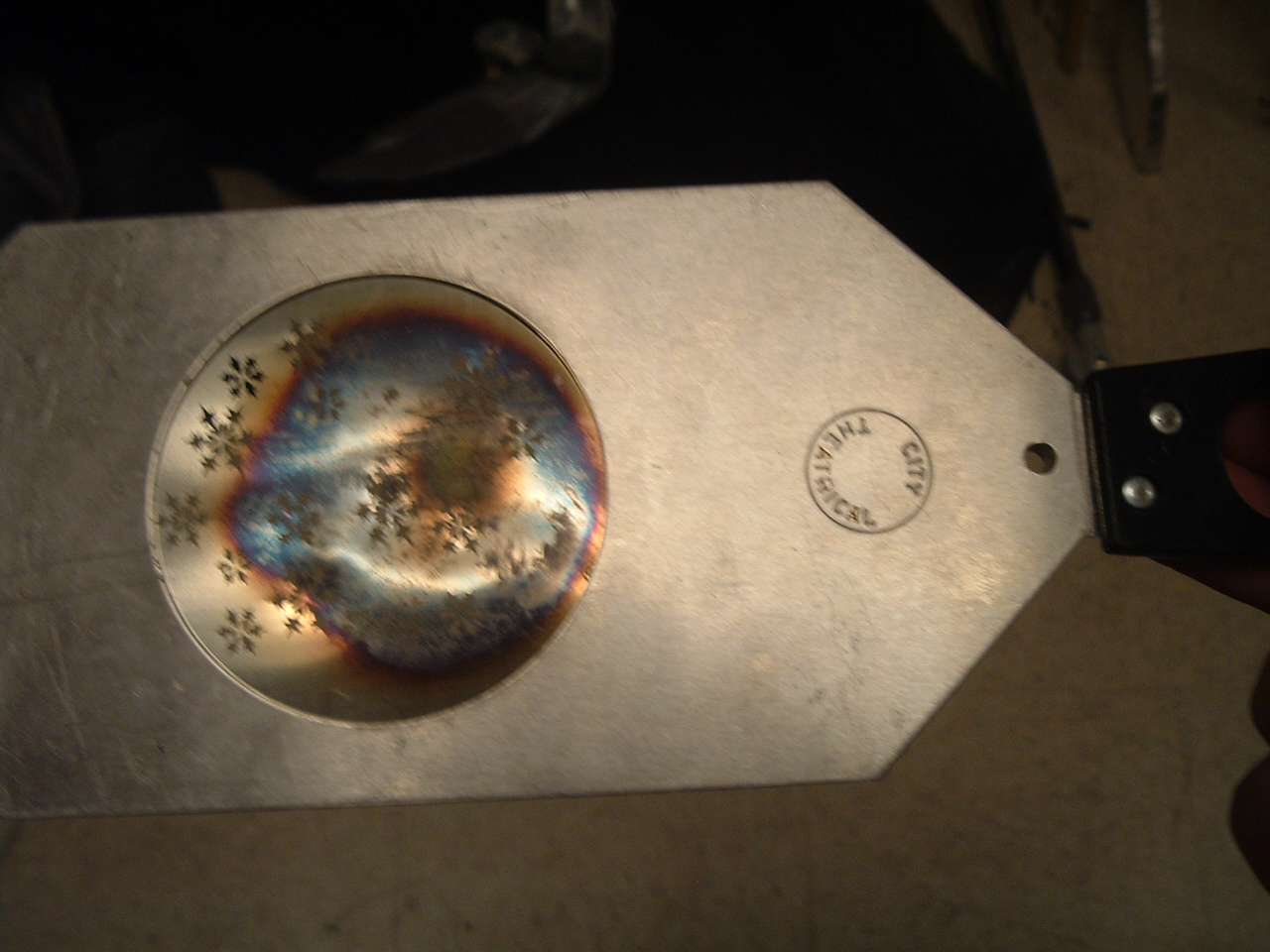
A gobo in a gobo holder, which goes in a stage lighting instrument. The discolored portion is oxidation of the stainless steel caused by the high temperature of the lamp, but the gobo is still usable.

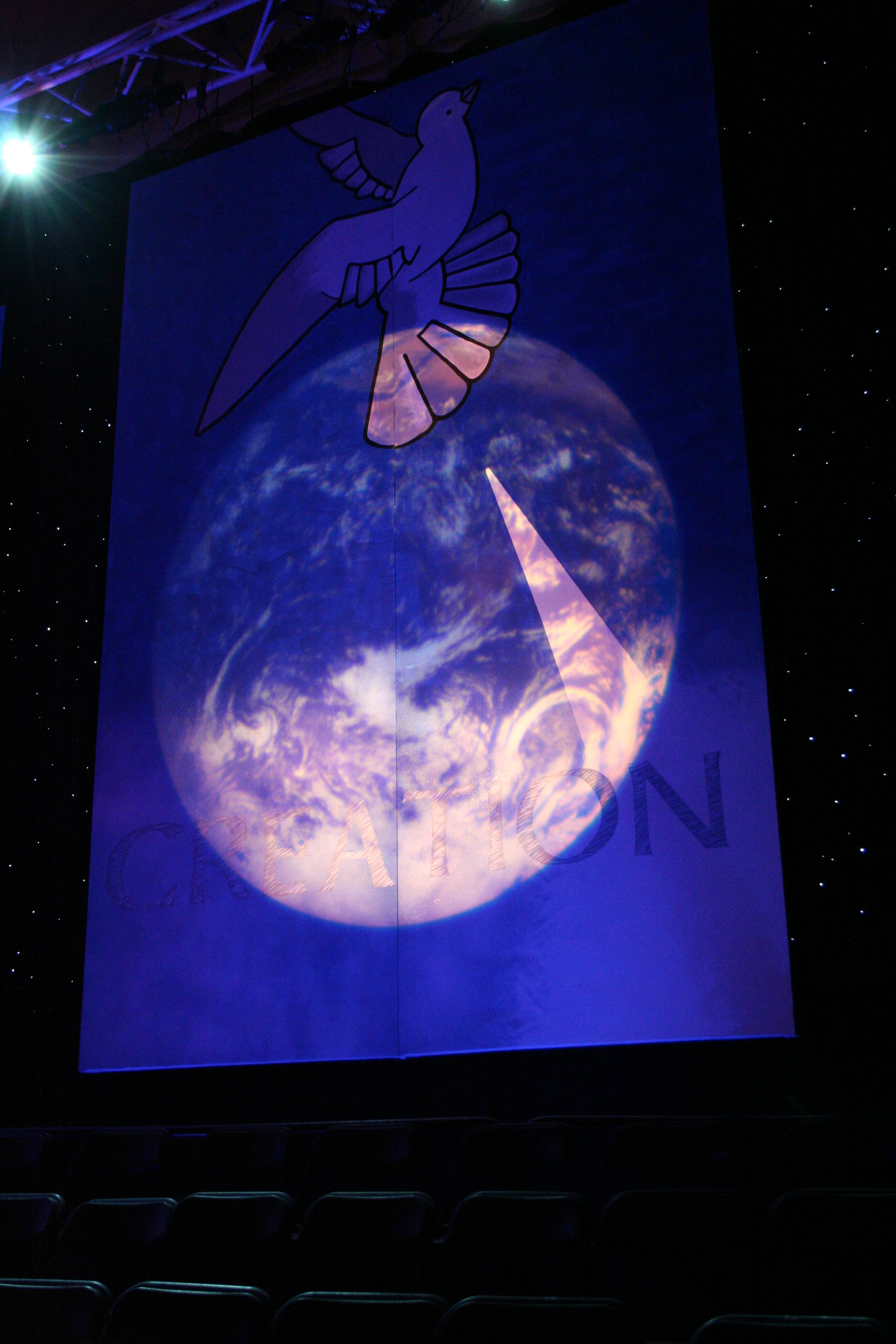
A glass gobo of the Earth, projected using a halogen projector

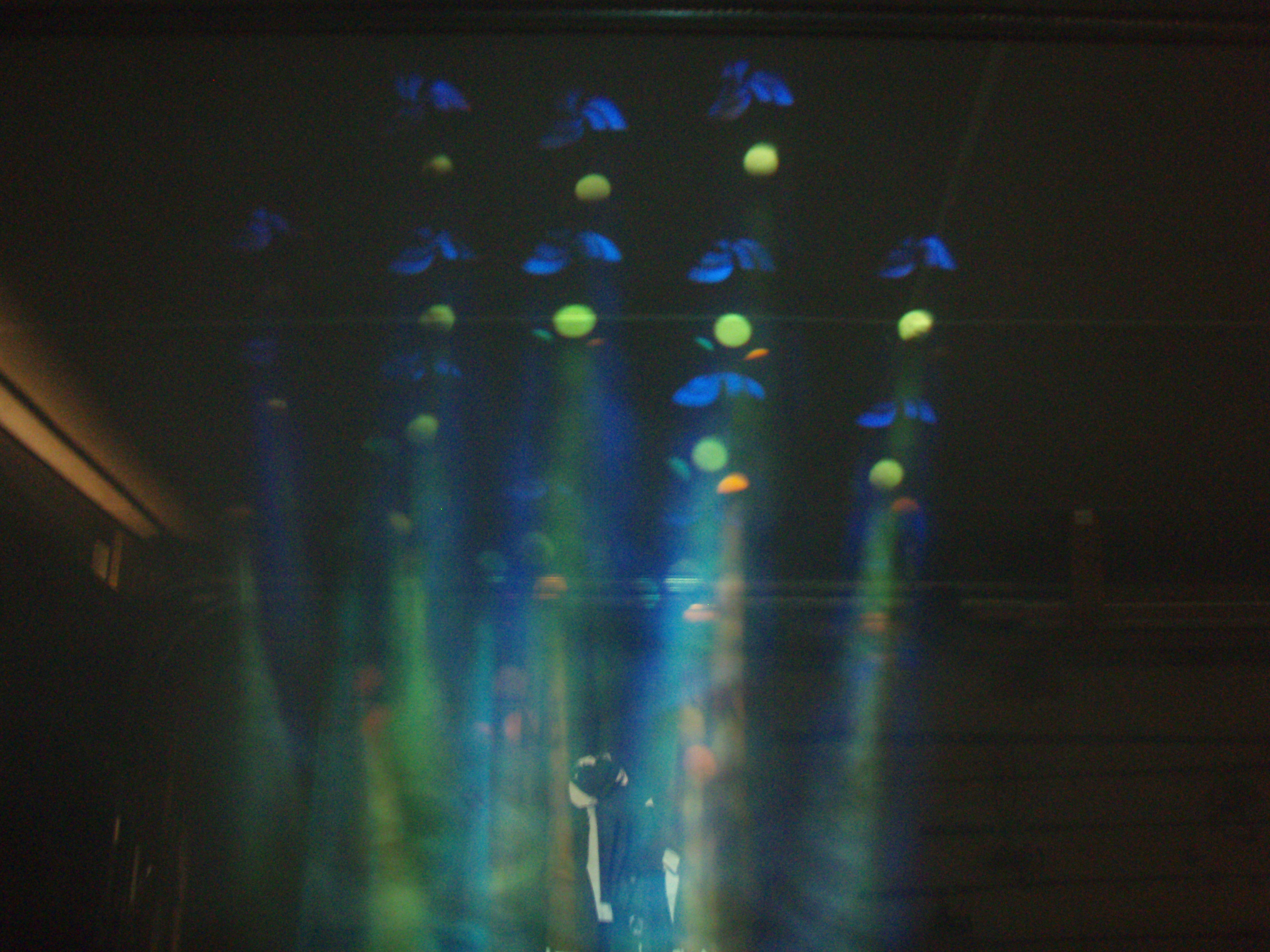
A gobo being projected with beams of smoke

Gobos are used with projectors and simpler light sources to create lighting scenes in theatrical applications. Simple gobos, incorporated into automated lighting systems, are popular at nightclubs and other musical venues to create moving shapes. Gobos may also be used for architectural lighting, as well as in interior design, as in projecting a company logo on a wall.

Placement in "the gate" or at the "point of focus" is important because it produces a crisp, sharp-edged pattern or design (of logos, fine detail, architecture, etc.). Lighting designers typically use them with stage lighting instruments to manipulate the shape of the light cast over a space or object—for example, to produce a pattern of leaves on a stage floor. Gobos placed after the optics do not produce a finely focused image, and are more precisely called "flags" or "cucoloris" ("cookies").

== Use in stage lighting ==
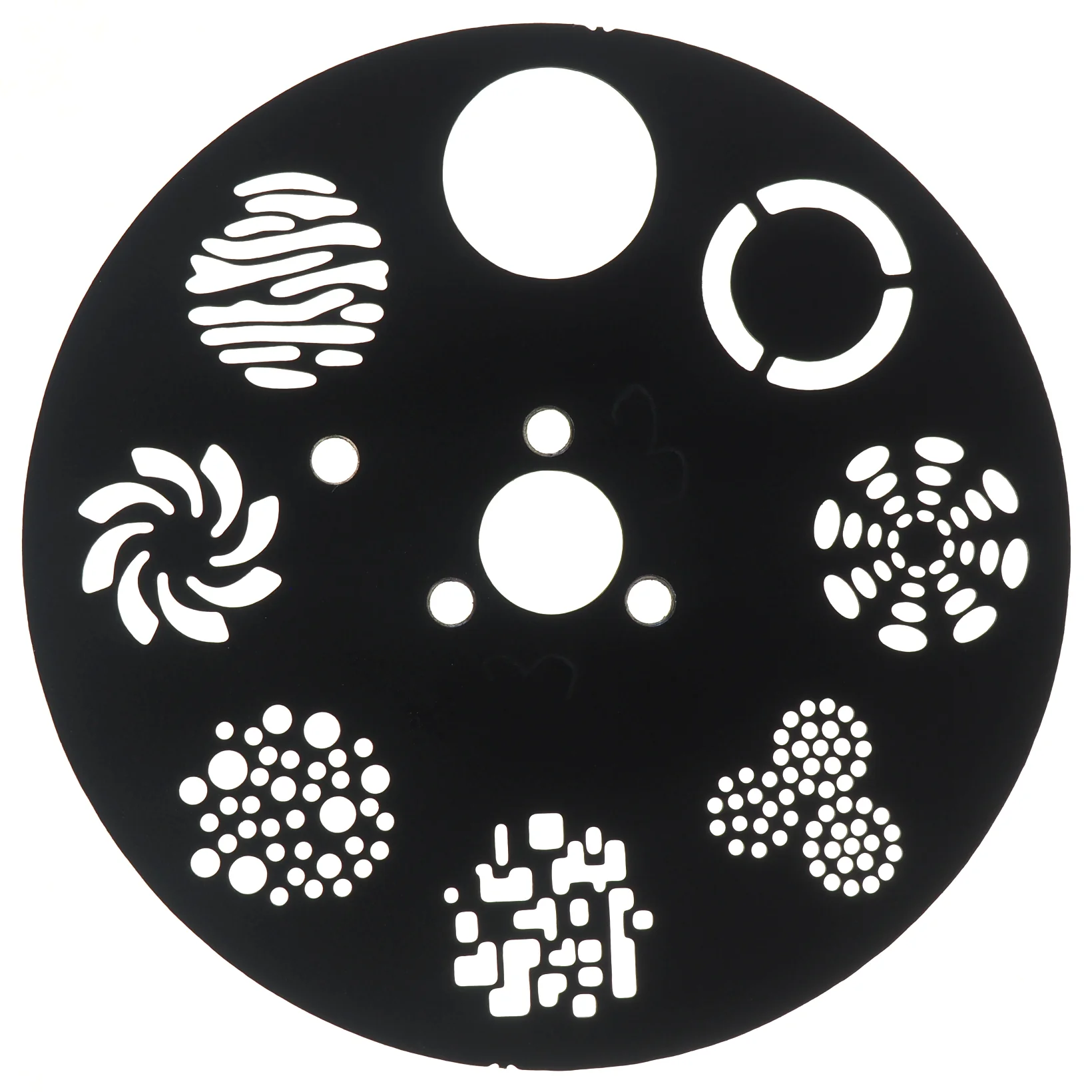
A gobo wheel example. Gobos here are non-replaceable and non-rotatable.

In DJ lighting, gobos are often combined into a gobo wheel.

== Materials ==
Gobos are made of various materials. Common types include steel, glass, and plastic.

Steel gobos or metal gobos use a metal template from which the image is cut out. These are the most sturdy, but often require modifications to the original design—called bridging—to display correctly. To correctly represent the letter "O", for example, requires small tabs or bridges to support the opaque center of the letter. These can be visible in the projected image, which might be undesirable in some applications.

Glass gobos are made from clear glass with a partial mirror coating to block the light and produce "black" areas in the projected image. This eliminates any need for bridging and accommodates more intricate images. Glass gobos can also include colored areas (much like stained glass windows), whether by multiple layers of dichroic glass (one for each color) glued on an aluminium or chrome-coated monochrome gobo, or by newer technologies that vary the thickness of the dichroic coating (and therefore the color) in a controlled way on a single piece of glass—which makes it possible to turn a color photo into a glass gobo. Glass gobos generally offer the highest image fidelity, but are the most fragile. Glass gobos are typically created with laser ablation or photo etching.

Plastic gobos or transparency gobos can be used in LED ellipsoidal spotlights. These "LED-only" plastic gobos can be full-color (like a glass gobo), but are far less delicate. They are new to the market, as are LED lights, and their durability and effectiveness vary between brands.

In the past, plastic gobos were generally custom-made for when a pattern requires color and glass does not suffice. However, in a "traditional" (tungsten-halogen) light fixture, the focus point position of a gobo is extremely hot, so these thin plastic films require special cooling elements to prevent melting. A lapse in the cooling apparatus, even for seconds, can ruin a plastic gobo in a tungsten-halogen lighting instrument.

== Patterns ==
Theatrical and photographic supply companies manufacture many simple and complex stock patterns. They also can produce custom gobos from customer artwork. Generally, a lighting designer chooses a pattern from a manufacturer's catalog. Because of the large number of gobos available, they are generally referred to by number, not name. Lighting technicians can also hand-cut custom gobos out of sheet metal stock, or even aluminum pie pans.

Gobos are often used in weddings and corporate events. They can project company logos, the couple's names, or just about any artwork. Some companies can turn a custom gobo out in as little as a week. Designers also use "stock" gobo patterns for these events—for example, for projecting stars or leaves onto the ceiling.

== Mechanics/optics ==
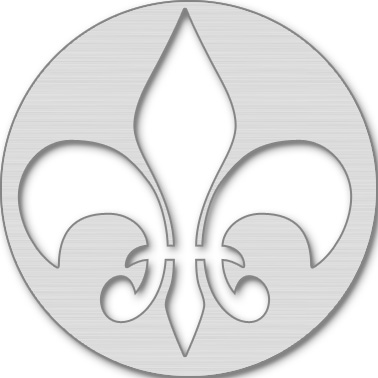
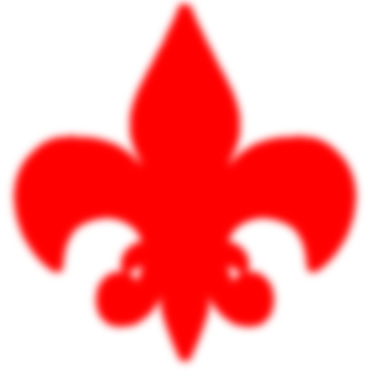
A gobo with the fleurs-de-lis design on the left projects with a red gel a pattern like the one on the right.

The gobo is placed in the focal plane of the lantern (generally an ellipsoidal reflector spotlight or a moving head). The gobo is inserted upside-down and back-to-front. The lighting instrument inverts the projected image.

== Common sizes ==
Letter size	O.D. (mm)	I.A. (mm)	Notes
C Size	150	120	
A Size	100	75	(ADB Europe 1000/1200 W)
B Size	86	64.5	Standard size for ellipsoidal lights (Source 4, Source 4 Zoom)
BG Size	79	64.5	
M Size	66	48	(Source 4 Jr.)
G Size	65.5	48	For Clay Paky Goldenscans.
D Size	53.3	38	(Martin PR-1, EcoSpot 40)
Golive	52.8	48	Golive 400
Cyberlight	44.25	38	
E Size	37.5	28	Martin Mac Viper, Mac 2000 Clay Paky Alpha Profile/Spot 1200/1500 Robe Colourspot 1200/2500AT Vari Lite VL3000 Spot, VL3500 EcoSpot 25, EcoSpot 30
Studio Spot 575	36.3	31	For HES Studio Spot 575.
Mac 500/918	27.9	22	
Robe Color spot	26.8	22	
V Size	25.5	22	For HES Intellibeam 700hx
Mac 250	22.5	17	
518 Size	20	13	
All RazLights	29	50	For all RazTech lighting fixtures

== See also ==
- Cucoloris
- Bat-Signal
