= Alpha mapping =

Technique in 3D computer graphics

Alpha mapping or transparency mapping is a technique in 3D computer graphics involving the use of texture mapping to designate the amount of transparency/translucency of areas in a certain object.

Alpha mapping is used when the given object's transparency is not consistent: when the transparency amount is not the same for the entire object and/or when the object is not entirely transparent. If the object has the same level of transparency everywhere, one can either use a solid-color alpha texture or an integer value.

The alpha map is often encoded in the alpha channel of an RGBA texture used for coloring, but can also exist as a standalone greyscale or coloured texture. An alpha map is often used in conjunction with a textured flat surface as part of billboarding.

== Blending methods ==
Alpha mapping is typically used in combination with blending operations in the rendering pipeline to combine transparent fragments with background colors. The most common approach is alpha blending, where the final pixel color is computed by mixing the source color with the destination color based on the alpha value.

In real-time graphics systems, different blending modes can be selected depending on the desired visual effect, such as standard transparency, additive blending for effects like fire or light glows, or multiplicative blending for shading overlays. Graphics APIs such as OpenGL and Direct3D define these blending operations as part of their fixed-function or programmable pipelines.

== See also ==
- Mask (computing) § Image masks
