= Amber shift =

Effect while dimming incandescent lights

Amber shift is a phenomenon of incandescent light bulbs in which the colour temperature decreases (appears more amber) as the current through the lamp decreases, which simultaneously dims the output. In the context of amber shift, brightness is measured as a percent of the lamp's maximum brightness.

== Mechanism ==
Relative spectral power distribution of a Planck radiator at different temperatures, with the color under the curve showing the approximate correlated color temperature. The amber shift is apparent at low temperatures.

Incandescent light bulbs operate by running a current through a resistive tungsten filament. The filament experiences Joule heating and will emit light dependent on the resulting temperature. The emitted light is black body radiation, so its colour is dependent on the filament's temperature and follows the Planckian locus. At high temperatures, approaching the melting point of tungsten (3,695 K; 3,422 °C; 6,191 °F, which acts as a hard upper limit for the filament's temperature) the colour will be near equal energy white. As the filament temperature decreases, so does the light's colour temperature. Counterintuitively, a decrease in colour temperature evokes a colour shift towards amber and is therefore described as becoming "warmer".

== Uses ==
This characteristic of incandescent lighting can be used for various practical applications where a different colour temperature of light is required.

=== Art exhibitions ===
Often an artist will want to show his or her work in high colour temperature light. The reason for this is because a higher colour temperature will give a more accurate representation of colours in paintings, photos, etc.

Some artists may use amber shift properties to accentuate the warmth of a piece.

=== Social and dining ===
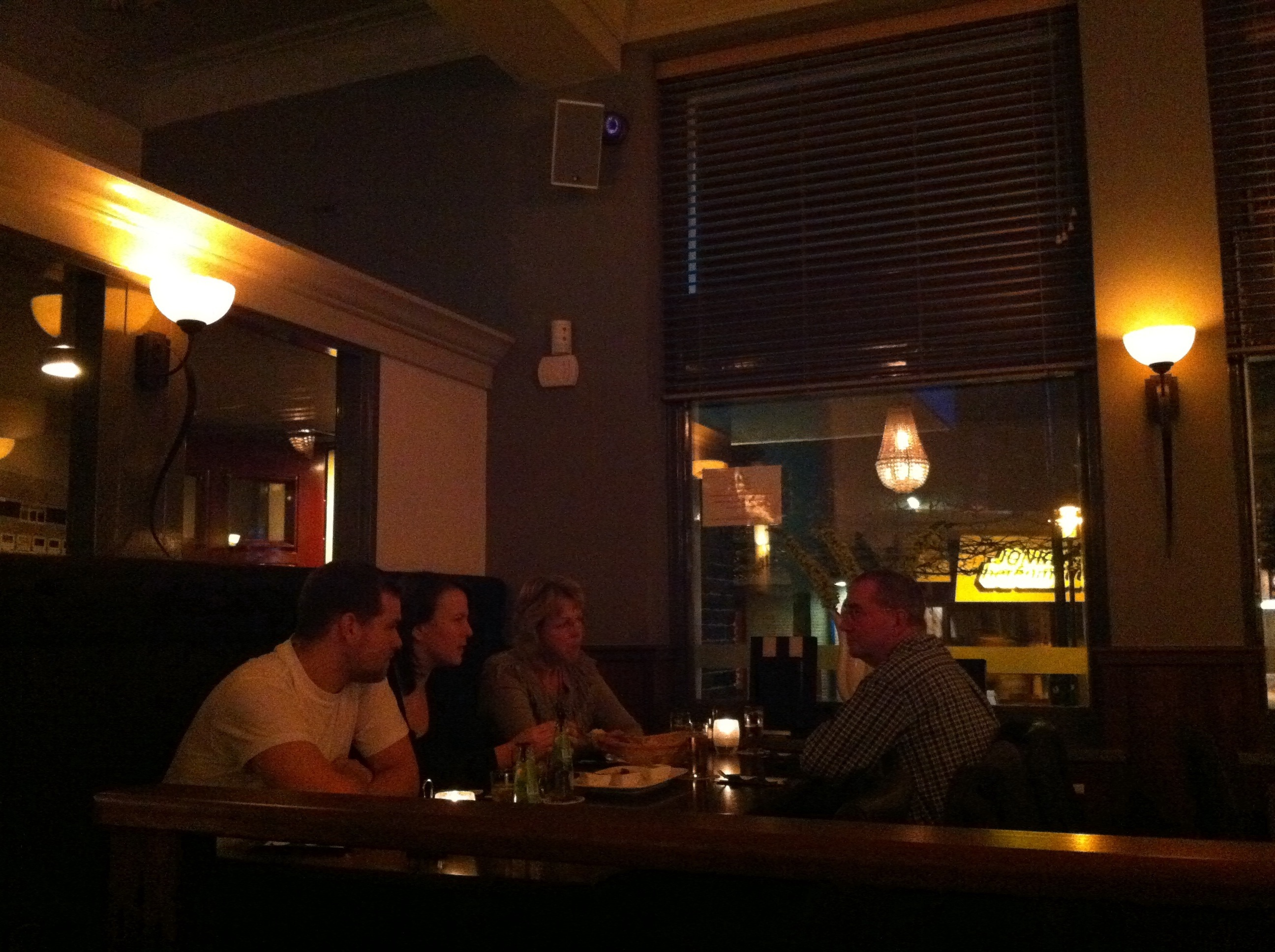
Dim lighting in a restaurant

Often restaurants, bars and other social gathering places will dim lighting to maximise amber shift. The reason for this is that the warmer (amber shifted) light shows skin tones in a more attractive manner. Some interior designers also feel that warmed light gives a more intimate feel.

== Counteracting amber shift ==
In cases where incandescent light is in use, but a high colour temperature is required, a technique called "colour temperature correction" may be used. This involves placing a "CT" light filter in front of a light source. To the naked eye this type of filter appears blue, but when put in front of an amber shifted light source it counteracts the dominant amber colours to produce a more white light through a process known as subtractive mixing.
