= DJ lighting =

Stage lighting used by disc jockeys

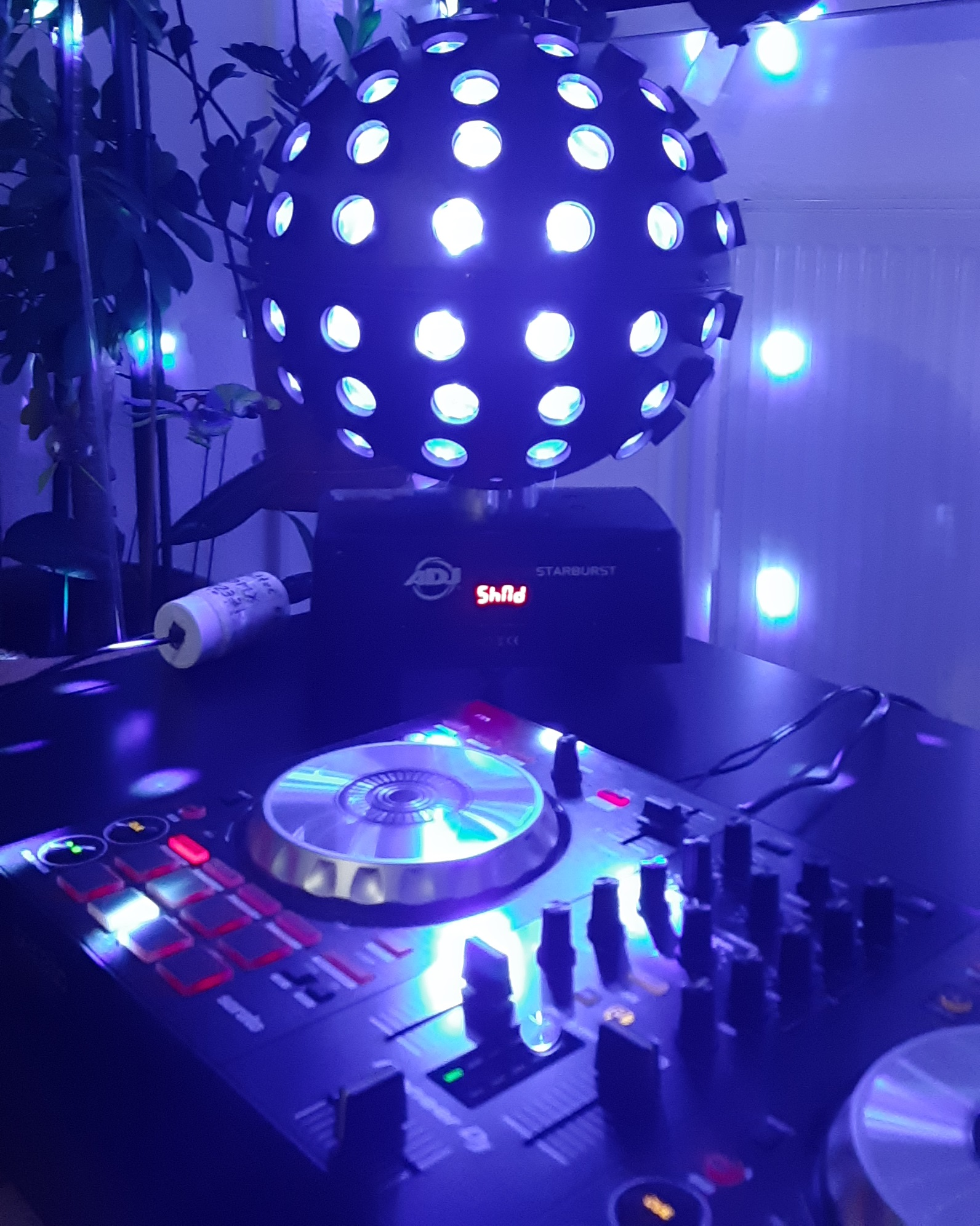
A rotating ball emitting light beams, similar to a mirror ball

DJ lighting is a variant of stage lighting that is used by mobile disc jockeys in nightclubs and in other venues.

There are many different types of DJ lighting such as scanners which use a mirror to reflect beams of light that move around, twister-style effects that project multiple beams of light that rotate in a twisting style and also strobe lighting that flash intensely.

DJ lighting can be controlled by an internal sound activation, where the unit has a built-in sound to light function. Other control options are master-slave (daisy chain) and DMX control.

== Types of DJ lighting ==
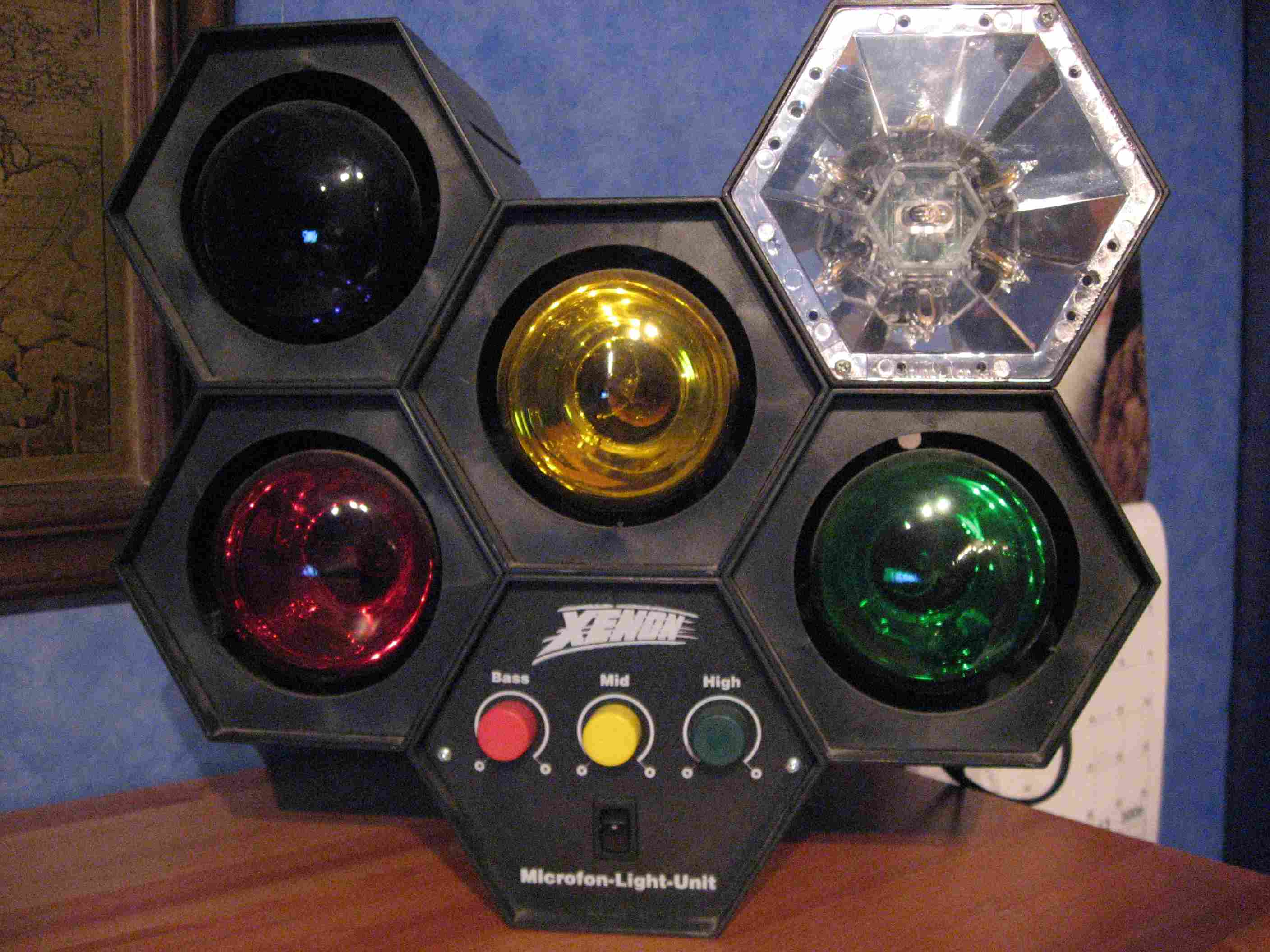
Light organ with strobe light

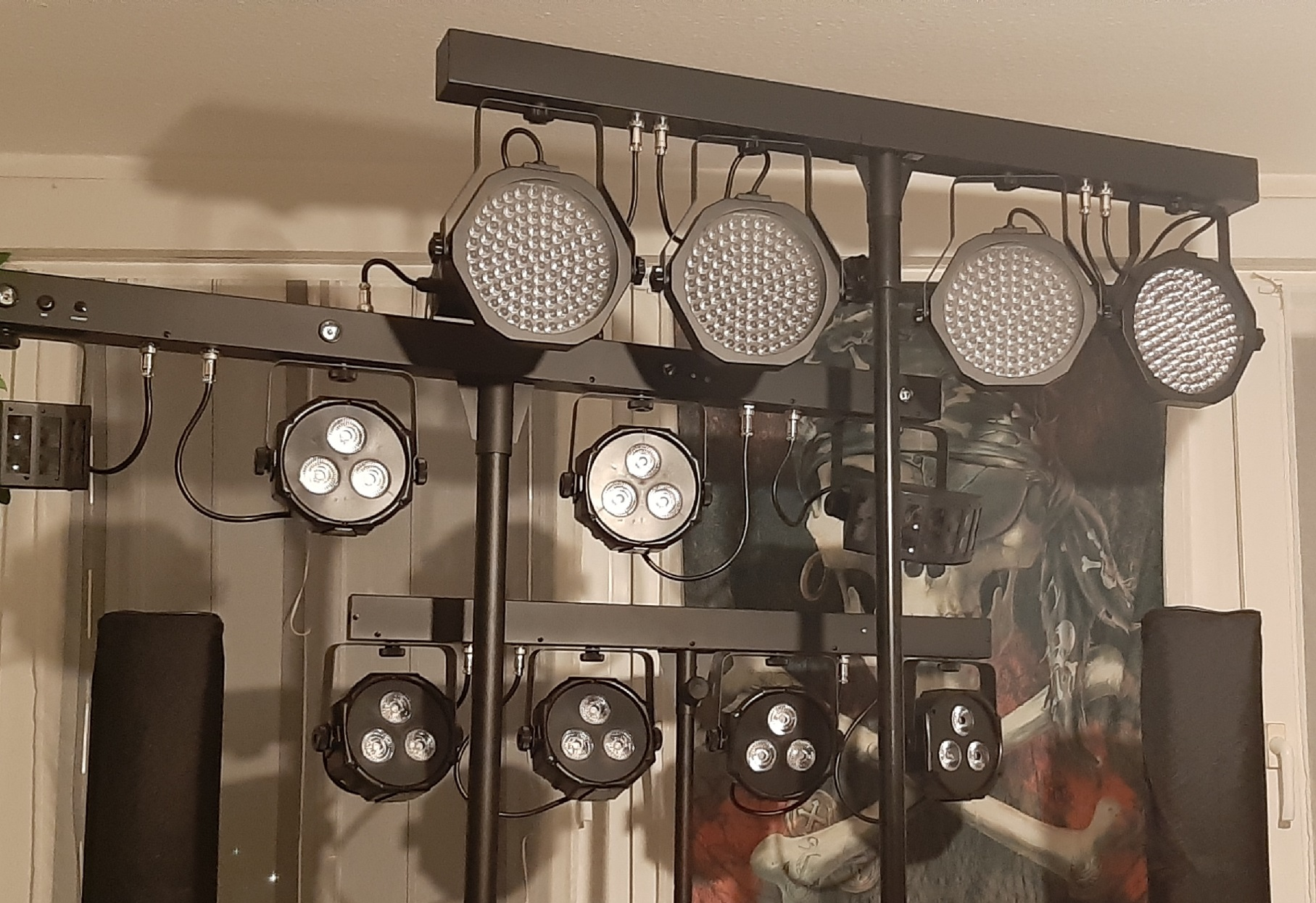
Various DJ lights for home use

It is generally considered that there are four types of DJ lighting.

=== Party lights ===
In the DJ equipment industry, any party disco light that is designed and sold for home use is considered a party DJ light or a party disco light.

=== Retro lights ===
In the early days of disco, the main types of disco light were colorful rotating balls. They looked very much like a mirrorball with multi-coloured par 16 lamps in them.

=== Projectors ===
With the technology of halogen lamps improving, the 80s and early 90s saw a new breed of DJ light starting to evolve. This was a projection-style DJ light that used a halogen lamp and a mirror to reflect the light. A halogen lamp shines onto a mirror via a filter gel sheet to create the color and sometimes via a gobo wheel to create shapes. In some DJ lighting effects a coloured mirror is used to avoid using color/filter gel.

Most modern projector DJ lights now use LEDs instead of halogen lamps.

=== Lasers ===
Lasers are a type of DJ light. They use a laser diode and an array of mirrors to project multiple colours and beams of light.
