= British Film Designers Guild =

(Also known as Designer's Guild or B.F.D.G. and can be seen after a member's name as a professional certification abbreviation)

A society of British Film Directors and Designers was founded in 1946, for the betterment of the Design in British Films. Out of this society grew the Guild of Film Art Directors, and the present British Film Designers Guild, who now include in their membership all the various branches of the Art Department. They are not a trade union. The British equivalent of the Art Directors Guild (of America), although smaller in size are one of the key organisations in the Cine Guilds of Great Britain that work directly with the UK Government: Select Committee on Culture, Media and Sport.

This Guild is presented primarily to assist Producers and others to select department members who will maintain the highest standards of Art Direction, even on the smallest of productions, and whose knowledge, experience and talent have been proven to be the highest in a medium where four-fifths of the spectators' attention is visual.

The British Film Designers Guild has members in every grade of the art department, from draughtspersons to costume designers, set decorators to production designers, and was formed with the aim of raising the standards and the profile of the art department and protecting the interest of its members.

== Art Department positions ==
The hierarchy in the United Kingdom does have some title variants with job descriptions. Here is a guide to the main positions within each area, as there are many alternatives dependent on the film requirements and to which country the film is based in. Some titles vary like for example Draughtsman UK, to Set Designer or Draftsman USA . The Production Designer is the head of various departments, Art, Construction, Decorating, Property & Prop Making. Here is a guide to the main positions within each area.

- Production designer (Feature film), Supervising art director – controls staff, work & schedule req., Art director (or Production designer for Commercials) usually several positions – controls several sets, draughts, organizes & liaises with trades, Stand-by art director (shooting crew), Assistant art director – draughts & liaises with trades, Art department co-ordinator, Senior draughtsperson (lead set designer U.S.) experienced draughtspeople who choose to stay drawing board based, draughtsperson (Set designer or Draftsperson U.S.), Junior draughtsperson, Art department assistant or Runner (Production runner U.S.).
- Set decorator (a.k.a. dresser U.K.) – selects all props and set dressing. (Set decorator U.S. is in charge of background dressing and stand-by), Production buyer, Assistant set decorator, Assistant buyer.
- Property master – controls prop collecting, storing, dressing, manufacture and stand-by.(Property master U.S., is in charge of action props – acquiring, manufacturing and stand-by. Assistant property master, Supervising props dresser Lead man U.S., Props storeman, Props co-ordinator, Stand-by props (also On-set U.S.), Props dresser Set dresser U.S. or Swing gang U.S. (Swing gang can also refer to set construction in the U.S.) , Prop dresser (Note Set decoration and Property are different departments in U.S.)
- Construction manager, Assistant construction manager, Construction buyer, H.o.D. (Head of Department) Carpenter (a.k.a. Chippie), H.o.D. Painter, H.o.D. Plasterer, H.o.D. Rigger & H.o.D. Stagehand (a.k.a. Stag). Within each department is Supervising, Chargehand positions to Labourers & Apprentices.
- H.o.D. Prop maker – works in conjunction with Props, Senior prop makers, Prop maker, Sculptors & Apprentices.

Other titles include Visual Effects art director, Vehicles art director, Locations art director, Concept artist (Illustrator U.S.), Storyboard artist, Graphic designer, Sign writer or Lettering artist, Model maker, Armourer, Greensman (Greenskeeper U.S.), Drapes master and Scenic artist.

Refer also to Film crew & Art Department Guide U.S..

== Collecting Society ==
This Society was formed out of work done within the Guild to benefit members and has since grown to assist many other departments within film production.

The BFDG no longer operates as a collecting society.

== Recent Chairs ==
- 1980-1982 - Alan Tomkins
- 1982-1984 - Tony Curtis
- 1984-1986 - Peter Lamont
- 1986-1988 - Charles Bishop
- 1988-1990 - John Graysmark
- 1990-1992 - Peter Lamont
- 1992-1994 - Peter Murton
- 1994-1996 - Peter Lamont
- 1996-1998 - Terry Ackland-Snow
- 1998-2000 - Austen Springs
- 2000-2002 - Peter Lamont
- 2002-2004 - Terry Ackland-Snow
- 2004-2006 - Fred Hole
- 2006-2008 - Terry Ackland-Snow
- 2008-2010 - Malcolm Stone
- 2010-2012 - Kevin Phipps
- 2012-2014 - Susan Whitaker
- 2014-2016 - Simon Bowles
- 2016-2018 - Peter Walpole
- 2018-2020 - Adam O'Neill
- 2020-2022 - Sonja Klaus
- 2022-2024 - Blair Barnette
- 2024----- - Jonathan Paul Green

== Closely related departments ==
- Camera
- Locations
- SFX – Special effects (Physical or Mechanical effects U.S.)
- VFX – Visual effects

== Famous members ==
- Ken Adam, Production designer – Dr. Strangelove, The Ipcress File, Barry Lyndon
- John Barry, Production designer – A Clockwork Orange, Star Wars
- Gavin Bocquet, Production designer – Star Wars II & III
- John Box, Production designer & B.F.D.G. Ex Officio – Lawrence of Arabia, Doctor Zhivago, A Passage to India
- Allan Cameron, Production designer – The Da Vinci Code
- Peter Lamont , Production designer & B.F.D.G. Ex Officio – Titanic, True Lies & various Bonds films
- Anthony Masters, Production designer – 2001: A Space Odyssey
- Anthony Pratt, Production designer – The Phantom of the Opera
- Michael Stringer , Production designer/Art director & G.F.A.D. Ex Officio – Casino Royale (1967), Fiddler on the roof
- Lindy Hemming, Costume designer – Casino Royale, Topsy-Turvy

== Published articles ==
- British Broadcasting B.B.C. online news report inc. BFDG/Collecting society
- Memorandum submitted by the Cine Guilds of Great Britain U.K. Government – House of Commons report
- The objectives of the C.G.G.B. Cine Guilds of Great Britain

== Related literature ==
- Film Design, Terence Marner. (Tantivy Press, 1973. ISBN 0-900730-69-2)
- The Oxford Guide to Film Studies, John Hill. (Oxford University, 1998. ISBN 0-19-871124-7)
- Ken Adam: The Art of Production Design, Christopher Frayling. (Faber and Faber, 2006. ISBN 0-571-22057-6)

== See also ==
- Blank tape levy

=== Wikibooks ===
- Movie Making Manual

=== Wikiversity ===
- v:Filmmaking
