= Film crew =

Group of people involved in some phase of the making of a film

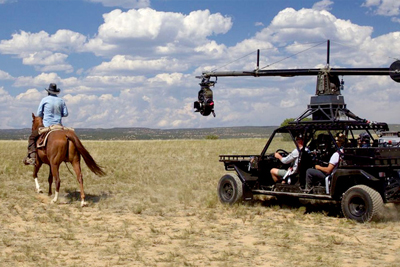
One part of the film crew (right), filming a member of the cast (left).

A film crew is a group of people, hired by a production company, for the purpose of producing a film or motion picture. The crew is distinguished from the cast, as the cast are understood to be the actors who appear in front of the camera or provide voices for characters in the film. The crew is also separate from the producers, as the producers are the ones who own a portion of either the film studio or the film's intellectual property rights. A film crew is divided into different departments, each of which specializes in a specific aspect of the production. Film crew positions have evolved over the years, spurred by technological change, but many traditional jobs date from the early 20th century and are common across jurisdictions and filmmaking cultures.

Motion picture projects have three discrete stages: development, production, and distribution. Within the production stage there are also three clearly defined sequential phases (pre-production, principal photography, and post-production) and many film crew positions are associated with only one or two of the phases. Distinctions are also made between above-the-line personnel (such as the director, screenwriter, and producers) who begin their involvement during the project's development stage, and the below-the-line technical crew involved only with the production stage.

== Director ==
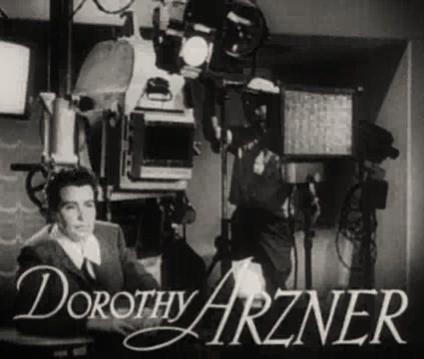
Film director Dorothy Arzner had a successful career that spanned the silent film era into talkies. She started as a film editor and designed the first boom microphone.

A director is the person who directs the making of a film. The director most often has the highest authority on a film set. Generally, a director controls a film's artistic and dramatic aspects and visualizes the screenplay (or script) while guiding the technical crew and actors in the fulfillment of that vision. The director has a key role in choosing the cast members, production design, and the creative aspects of filmmaking. Under European Union law, the director is viewed as the author of the film.

The director gives direction to the cast and crew, and creates an overall vision through which a film eventually becomes realized or noticed. Directors need to be able to mediate differences in creative visions and stay within the boundaries of the film's budget. There are many pathways to becoming a film director. Some directors started as screenwriters, cinematographers, film editors, or actors. Other directors have attended a film school. Directors use different approaches. Some outline a general plotline and let the actors improvise dialogue, while others control every aspect, and demand that the actors and crew follow instructions precisely. Some directors also write their own screenplays or collaborate on screenplays with long-standing writing partners. Some directors edit or appear in their films, or compose the music score for their films.

== Production ==
Production is generally not considered a department as such, but rather as a series of functional groups. These include the film's producers and executive producers and production office staff such as the production manager, the production coordinator, and their assistants; the various assistant directors; the accounting staff and sometimes the locations manager and their assistants.

Producer
A film producer creates the conditions for filmmaking. The producer initiates, coordinates, supervises, and controls matters such as fund raising, hiring key personnel, and arranging for distributors. The producer is involved throughout all phases of the film making process from development to completion of a project. There may be several producers on a film who may take a role in a number of areas, such as development, financing or production.
Executive producer
An executive producer (EP) is a producer who was not involved in the technical aspects of the filmmaking process in the original definition, but has played a financial or creative role in ensuring that the project goes into production. Today, however, the title has become ambiguous, particularly in feature films. Since the 1980s, it has become increasingly common for the line producer to be given the title of executive producer, while the initiating producer takes the "produced by" credit. On other projects, the reverse happens, with the line producer taking the "produced by" credit. So the two credits have become effectively interchangeable, with no precise definition.

=== Production office ===
Line producer
The line producer is the liaison between the studio or producer and the production manager, responsible for managing the production budget. The title is associated with the idea that they are the person who is "on the line" on a day-to-day basis, and responsible for lining up the resources needed.
Production assistant
Production assistants, referred to as PAs, assist in the production office or in various departments with general tasks, such as assisting the first assistant director with set operations.

Runner

An entry-level role similar to a PA.

==== Production managements ====
Unit production manager
The unit production manager (UPM) supervises the physical aspects of the production (not the creative aspects) including personnel, technology, budget, and scheduling. It is the production manager's responsibility to make sure the filming stays on schedule and within its budget. The PM also helps manage the day-to-day budget by managing operating costs such as salaries, production costs, and everyday equipment rental costs. The PM often works under the supervision of a line producer and directly supervises the production coordinator.
Assistant production manager
The assistant production manager is the assistant to and carries out various jobs for the UPM. Normally only big budget Hollywood feature films have an assistant PM.
Unit manager
The unit manager fulfills the same role as the production manager but for secondary "unit" shooting. In some functional structures, the unit manager subsumes the role of the transport coordinator.
Production coordinator
The production coordinator is the information nexus of the production, responsible for organizing all the logistics from hiring crew, renting equipment, and booking talent. The PC is an integral part of film production.
First assistant director
The first assistant director (1st AD) assists the production manager and director. The ultimate aim of any 1st AD is to ensure the film comes in on schedule while maintaining a safe working environment in which the director, principal artists (actors) and crew can be focused on their work. They oversee day-to-day management of the cast and crew scheduling, equipment, script, and set. A 1st AD may also be responsible for directing background action for major shots or the entirety of relatively minor shots, at the director's discretion.
Second assistant director
The second assistant director (2nd AD) is the chief assistant of the 1st AD and helps carry out those tasks delegated to the 1st AD. The 2nd AD may also direct background action and extras in addition to helping the 1st AD with scheduling, booking, etc. The 2nd AD is responsible for creating call sheets that let the crew know the schedule and important details about the shooting day.
Other assistant directors
Sometimes other assistant directors are needed such as in Canadian and British functional structures the 3rd assistant director (3rd AD) and even trainee assistant directors (trainee AD). In the American system there are 2nd 2nd assistant director (2nd 2nd AD). Normally in the American system 2nd 2nd ADs control big crowd extras and make sure if shooting on location none of the public get into shots.

==== Accounting ====
Production accountant
Production accountants manage the money and ensure the production comes in on budget and everyone gets paid. The industry is notorious for unusual accounting methods which are collectively labelled Hollywood accounting. Production accountants are often assisted by assistant accountants, sometimes called clerks, responsible for accounts receivable, accounts payable and payroll.

=== Locations ===
Location manager
Oversees the locations department and its staff, typically reporting directly to the production manager or assistant director (or even director or executive producer). Location manager is responsible for final clearing (or guaranteeing permission to use) a location for filming and must often assist production and finance departments in maintaining budget management regarding actual location/permit fees as well as labor costs to production for the locations department at large.
Assistant location manager
Works with the location manager and the various departments in arranging technical scouts for the essential staff (grips, electric, camera, etc.) to see options which the location manager has selected for filming. The assistant location manager will be onset during the filming process to oversee the operation, whereas the location manager continues pre-production from elsewhere (generally an office) on the upcoming locations. (On most location-based television shows, there will be two assistant location managers that alternate episodes, allowing one to prep an upcoming episode while the other is on set with the current one)
Location scout
Does much of the actual research, footwork and photography to document location possibilities. Often the location manager will do some scouting themselves, as well as the assistant location manager.
Location assistant
Hired by the location manager to be on set before, during, and after the filming process. General responsibilities include arriving first at the location to allow the set dressers into the set for preparation; maintaining the cleanliness of the location areas during filming; fielding complaints from neighbours; and ultimately, at the end of the filming, making sure it seems as though the film crew was never there. There are generally one to three assistants on a shoot at any given time.
Location production assistant
This position exists generally on larger budget productions. The locations PA is the assistant who is almost never on set, but instead is always prepping a location or "wrapping" a location; that is, when a location requires several days of setup and breakdown preceding and following the day(s) of filming. A location production assistant is what a set production assistant is in Canada.

=== Digital service ===
Since the turn of the 21st century, several additional professionals are now routinely listed in the production credits on most major motion pictures.

Social publicist
The publicist liaises between the film production and the media. They create press releases, in collaboration with the producers, and work with the unit still photographer.
Legal counsel
Entertainment lawyers negotiate contracts, clear licensing rights for any intellectual property used in the film, obtain tax credits from local governments, and take care of immigration paperwork when cast or crew cross international borders to shoot on location.
System administrator
A system administrator or sysadmin, is a person employed to maintain and operate a computer system or network. This role is increasingly important for digital monitors on set, digital intermediate editing and post production, digital effects, digital sound, and sometimes for full digital production.

=== Continuity ===
Script supervisor
Also known as the continuity person, the script supervisor keeps track of what parts of the script have been filmed and makes notes of any deviations between what was actually filmed and what appeared in the script. They make notes on every shot, and keep track of props, blocking, and other details to ensure continuity between shots and scenes. An important part of a script supervisor's job is to make sure that the actors' movements, the directions they are looking in a shot, particularly when speaking to or responding to another actor, plus the positions of props they are using and every thing else matches from shot to shot. If there is an apparent mismatch, the director must be informed immediately so that it can be reshot before the lighting setup is changed or at least before the location is wrapped and the set is struck. Not only does the job of script supervisor require a great deal of awareness and meticulous note-taking skills, it also requires much diplomacy to advise the director that they may have a problem editing something just recorded. The script supervisor is also in charge of providing the "official" scene numbers and take numbers to the second camera assistant (clapper loader in some countries) for the slate, as well as to the sound mixer, and to clearly note which take the director has chosen to be used (as a "print", in film terms) in the finished product. All of this information is then relayed to the editor every day after shooting has wrapped in the form of copies made of both the script supervisor's notes as well as their matching script pages.

=== Casting ===
Casting director
The casting director chooses the actors for the characters of the movie. This usually involves inviting potential actors to read an excerpt from the script for an audition.
Cast production assistant
The cast PA assists the actors of the film. This usually involves personal and technical requests, that might be highly sensible and private or common domain or knowledge.

== Camera and lighting ==
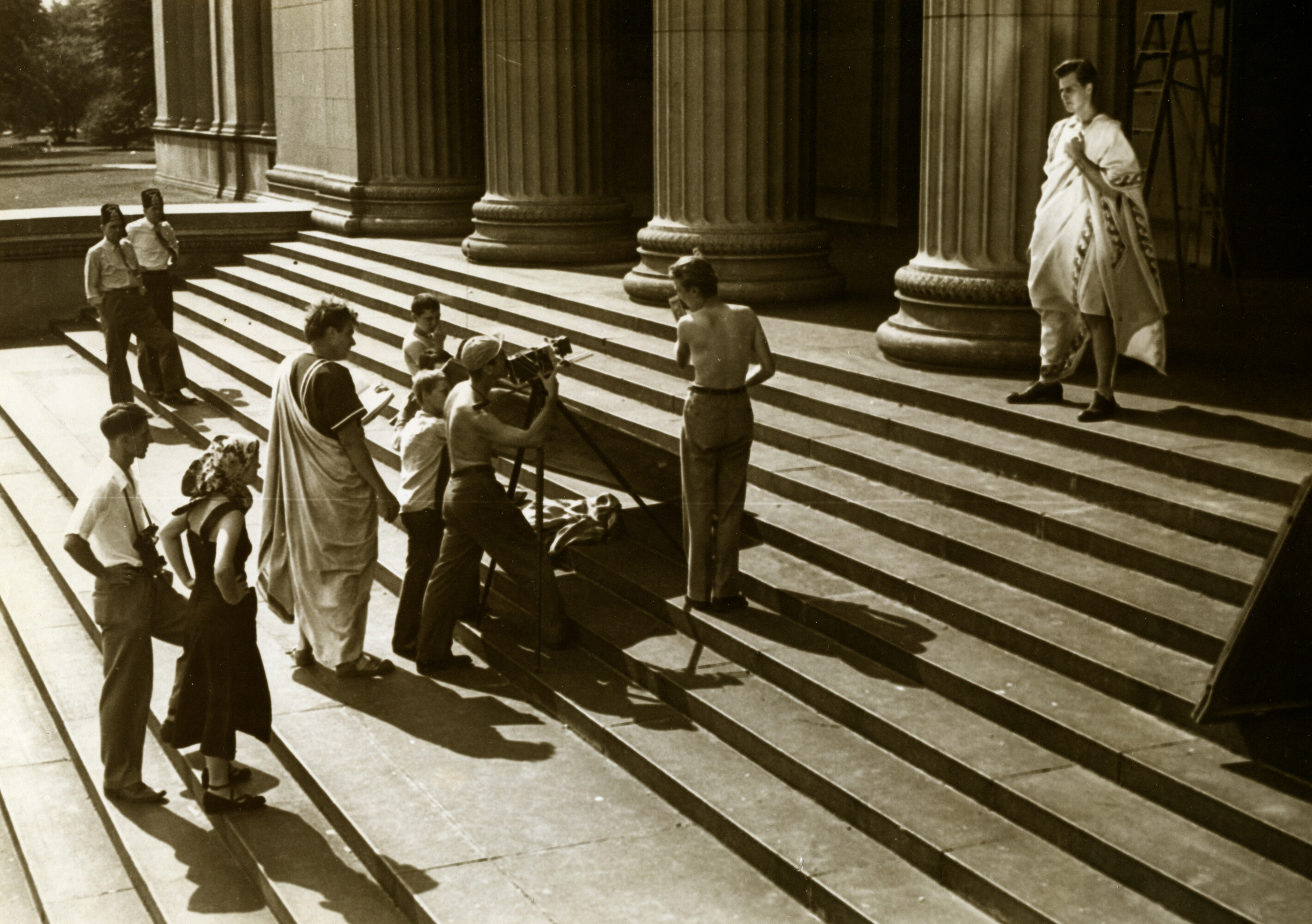
A camera operator filming a scene from the Hollywood film Julius Caesar (1950), starring Charlton Heston.

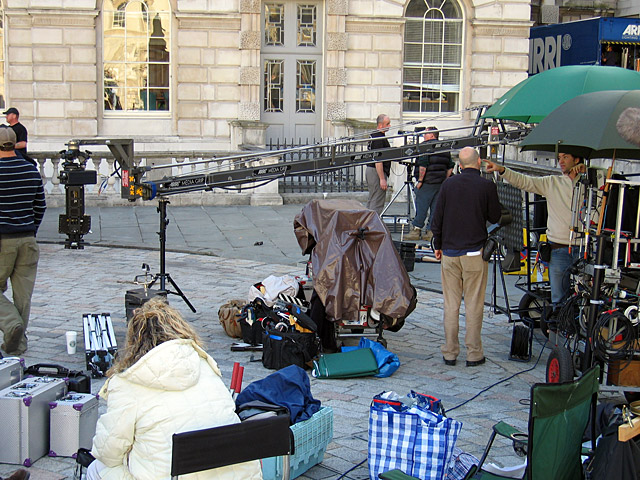
Production of the television film Sherlock Holmes and the Case of the Silk Stocking (2004) at Somerset House in London.

Director of photography
The director of photography (sometimes shortened to DP or DoP) is in charge of the look of the "frame" of the movie shots, hence the name "photography". They are the chief of the camera and lighting crew of the film. The DP makes decisions on lighting and framing of shots in conjunction with the film's director. Typically, the director tells the DP how they want a shot to look, and the DP chooses the correct lens, filter, lighting and composition to achieve the desired aesthetic effect. The DP is the senior creative crew member after the director.
The term cinematographer is usually synonymous with director of photography, though some professionals insist this only applies when the director of photography and camera operator are the same person.

=== Camera ===
Camera operator
The camera operator uses the camera at the direction of the cinematographer, director of photography, or the film director to capture the scenes on film or video. Generally, a cinematographer or director of photography does not operate the camera, but sometimes these jobs may be combined.
First assistant camera
The first assistant camera, 1st AC or focus puller, is responsible for keeping the camera in focus as it is shooting, as well as building the camera at the beginning of the day and taking it apart at the end. They also thread the film when a new magazine is loaded.
Second assistant camera
The second assistant camera, 2nd AC or clapper loader, operates the clapperboard commonly referred to in the United States as a "slate" at the beginning of each take and loads the raw film stock or blank videocassette into the camera magazines between takes, if there is no additional specifically designated film loader. The 2nd AC is also in charge of overseeing the meticulously kept notebooks that record when the film stock is received, used, and sent to the lab for processing. Additionally, the 2nd AC oversees organization of camera equipment and transport of the equipment from one shooting location to another.
Film loader
The film loader transfers motion picture film from the manufacturer's light-tight canisters to the camera magazines for attachment to the camera by the 2nd AC. After exposure during filming, the loader then removes the film from the magazines and places it back into the light-tight cans for transport to the laboratory. It is the responsibility of the loader to manage the inventory of film and communicate with the 1st AC on the film usage and remaining stock throughout the day. On small production crews, this job is often combined with the 2nd AC. With the prevalence of digital photography, this role is taken on by the digital imaging technician.
Camera production assistant
The camera PA, camera intern or camera trainee, assists the crew while learning the trade of the camera assistant, operator or cinematographer.
Digital imaging technician
On digital photography productions the digital imaging technician, or DIT, is responsible for the coordination of the internal workings of the digital camera. Under the direction of the cinematographer or director of photography, the DIT will make adjustments to the multitude of variables available in most professional digital cameras to creatively or technically manipulate the resulting image. It may also be the responsibility of the DIT to archive and manage the digital data, create compressed dailies from raw footage and prepare all digital images for post-production.
Steadicam operator
A steadicam operator is someone who is skilled at operating a steadicam (trademark for a camera stabilization rig). This person is usually one of the camera operators on the production.
Motion control technician/operator
This technician operates a motion control rig, which essentially is a 'camera robot' able to consistently repeat camera moves for special effects uses. Motion control rigs are typically rented with an experienced operator.
Set photographer
The Set Photographer is the person who creates film stills, still photographic images specifically intended for use in the marketing and publicity.

=== Lighting ===
Gaffer
The gaffer is the head of the lighting department, responsible for the design of the lighting plan for a production. Sometimes the gaffer is credited as chief lighting technician.
Best boy (electric)
The best boy electric is the chief assistant to the gaffer. They are not usually on set, but dealing with upkeep of the lighting truck, rentals, manpower, and other logistics. Sometimes the best boy electric is credited as assistant chief lighting technician.
Lighting technician/Electrics
Also called electrics or lamp operators, lighting technicians are involved with setting up and controlling lighting equipment and temporary power distribution on set.

=== Grip ===
Grips are trained lighting and rigging technicians. Their main responsibility is to work closely with the electrical department to put in the non-electrical components of lighting set-ups required for a shot, such as flags, overheads, and bounces. On the sound stage, they move and adjust major set pieces when something needs to be moved to get a camera into position. In addition to lifting heavy objects and setting rigging points for lights, they also report to the key grip. In the US and Canada, grips may belong to the International Alliance of Theatrical Stage Employees.

Key grip
The key grip is the chief grip on a set, and is the head of the set operations department. The key grip works with the director of photography to help set up the set and to achieve correct lighting and blocking. They are also used to manoeuver the cameras around the set.
Best boy (grip)
The best boy is chief assistant to the key grip. They are also responsible for organizing the grip truck throughout the day.
Dolly grip
The grip in charge of operating the camera dollies and camera cranes is called the dolly grip. They place, level, and move the dolly track, then push and pull the dolly, and usually a camera operator and camera assistant as riders.

== Sound production ==
Production sound mixer
The production sound mixer (or sound recordist) is the head of the sound department on location and is responsible for the operation of the audio mixer and recorder(s) which receive feeds from the microphones on set. It is their responsibility to decide how they will deploy their team to capture the sound for each shot, select which microphones will be used for each setup, mix audio from all of the microphones in real time into a "mix track" that will be used while viewing rushes and during the edit, and sometimes in the final film, and to maintain logs of audio related issues for post production. The sound mixer is considered a department head, and is thus completely responsible for all aspects of production sound.
Boom operator
The boom operator, first assistant sound or "1st AS", is responsible for using microphones on the end of boom poles (lightweight telescopic poles made of aluminium, or more commonly, carbon fibre) held above actor's heads during a scene to capture dialogue. It is also their responsibility to relay information from the "floor" back to the production sound mixer regarding upcoming shots, troublesome noises that the mixer will need to be made aware of if they can not be silenced, and for mounting radio microphones on actors. In France, the boom operator is called the perchman.
Second assistant sound
The second assistant sound, utility sound technician, or "2nd AS", is the assistant to the boom operator and is responsible for moving and preparing sound equipment for use around the set while the boom op watches rehearsals and prepares for the next shot, as well as handling wireless audio feeds to the director, script supervisor and producers, and laying carpet and other sound dampening materials in locations with problematic floors or a troublesome acoustic. In addition, the 2nd AS is regularly called upon to operate a second boom in scenes with a larger number of actors or where actors are physically spaced too far apart for the 1st AS to cover all of the dialogue with one microphone. The 2nd AS also regularly aids in the radio mic'ing of cast when there are a large number of actors in a scene. The term "sound utility technician" is now considered an outdated term by BECTU in the UK and 2nd AS is preferred, with sound utility technician as a role being omitted from recent versions of the rate card. The role is sometimes informally known as a "cable wrangler" or "cable boy".

== Art department ==
The art department in a major feature film can often number hundreds of people. Usually it is considered to include several sub-departments: the art department proper, with its art director, set designers and draftsmen; set decoration, under the set decorator; props, under the props master/mistress; construction, headed by the construction coordinator; scenic, headed by the key scenic artist; and special effects.

Production designer
The production designer is responsible for creating the visual appearance of the film – settings, costumes, character makeup; all taken as a unit. The production designer works closely with the director and the director of photography to achieve the look of the film.

=== Art (sets and graphic art) ===
Within the overall art department is a sub-department, also called the art department – which can be confusing. This consists of the people who design the sets and create the graphic art.

Art director
The art director reports to the production designer, and more directly oversees artists and craftspeople, such as the set designers, graphic artists, and illustrators who give form to the production design as it develops. The art director works closely with the construction coordinator and key scenic artist to oversee the aesthetic and textural details of sets as they are realized. Typically, the art director oversees the budget and schedule of the overall art department. On large-budget productions with numerous sets and several art directors, one might be credited as supervising art director or senior art director.
Standby art director
In the organizational system used in Ireland or the United Kingdom, the standby art director monitors the art department's work on set during filming on behalf of the production designer. They work closely with the standby painters and standby carpenters, and co-ordinate any changes to the set during filming. In the North American system, this work is shared between the props master and the on-set dresser.
Assistant art director
The first, second and third assistant art directors carry out the instructions of the art director. Their work often involves measuring locations and collecting other pertinent information for the production designer. Sometimes a set designer is also the first assistant art director. In this capacity, they manage the workflow and act as the foreman of the drawing office.
Illustrator
The illustrator draws or paints visual representations of the designs to communicate the ideas imagined by the production designer. Illustrators are sometimes credited as concept artists.
Graphic artist
The graphic artist is responsible for the design and creation of all graphic elements, including: signs, billboards, posters, logos, nameplates, and automotive-wrapping — that are created specifically for the film. They will often create several versions of a design, the preferred of which then being chosen by the production designer. On certain productions, they may also be employed, under the direction of the props master, in the creation of small, printed items, such as fliers, receipts, bills of sale, etc.

=== Sets ===
Set designer
The set designer is the draftsman, often an architect, who realizes the structures or interior spaces called for by the production designer.
Set decorator
The set decorator is in charge of the decorating of a film set, which includes the furnishings and all the other objects that will be seen in the film. They work closely with the production designer and coordinate with the art director. In recognition of the set decorator's importance, the Academy Award for art direction is given jointly to both the production designer and the set decorator.
Buyer
The buyer works with, and reports to, the set decorator. The buyer locates, and then purchases or rents the set dressing. Then there is the Leadman. The leadman (or leadperson) is the foreman of the set dressing crew, often referred to as the swing gang. They also assist the set decorator.
Set dresser
The set dressers apply and remove the "dressing"; i.e., furniture, drapery, carpets, wall signs, vinyl decals – everything one would find in a location, (even doorknobs and wall sockets, when such items do not fall under the purview of construction.) Most of the swing gang's work occurs before and after the shooting crew arrives, but one set dresser remains with the shooting crew and is known as the on-set dresser. In some countries, such as Ireland or the United Kingdom, the set dressing department is referred to as dressing props department. Informally, in the US, the department is often referred to simply as "set dec".
Greensman
The greensman or greensperson is a specialised set dresser dealing with the artistic arrangement or landscape design of plant material, sometimes real and sometimes artificial, and usually a combination of both. Depending on the scope of the greens work in a film, the greensperson may report to the art director or may report directly to the production designer. If a significant amount of greens work is required in a film, then the greens may be an identifiable sub-department, with its own team – often of a size numbering double figures – and hierarchy (e.g., greensmaster, greens supervisor, foreperson, leading hand, laborers). Specialists from other areas of the art dept. (e.g., fabricators, sculptors, painters, scenics) may also be drafted to work exclusively on greens.

=== Construction ===
Construction coordinator
The construction coordinator oversees the construction of all the sets. The coordinator orders materials, schedules the work, and supervises the often sizeable construction crew of carpenters, painters and labourers. In some jurisdictions the construction coordinator is called the construction manager.
Head carpenter
The head carpenter is the foreman of a gang of carpenters and laborers.
Propmaker
The propmaker (prop fabricator), as the name implies, builds the props that are used for the film. In US jurisdictions, propmakers are carpenters who build props and sets, and are often technicians skilled in wood and metalwork.

=== Scenic ===
Key scenic
The key scenic artist (scenic charge) is responsible for the surface treatments of the sets. This includes special paint treatments such as aging and gilding, as well as simulating the appearance of wood, stone, brick, metal, stained glass—anything called for by the production designer. The key scenic artist supervises the crew of painters, and is often a master craftsperson. In the UK, the above responsibilities would normally be those of the head painter, and the scenic artist is responsible for producing artist painted backings. In the US, a key scenic is called the charge scenic.
Head of the Plastering Department
The Head of the Plastering Department is responsible for managing fibrous plasterers, who are highly skilled plasters who can re-create any period, using mold making and casting abilities.

=== Property ===
Propmaster
The propmaster or mistress is in charge of finding and managing all the props that appear in the film. These include any items handled by actors that are not part of the scenery or costumes, and all consumable food items that appear on screen. Job responsibilities include purchasing, renting, and manufacturing anything actors handle or touch. In period works, it is the propmaster's job to ensure that the props provided are accurate to the time period. The propmistress usually has several assistants. The assistant propmaster is the person running the set and in charge of working directly with the actors, director, and on-set crew.
Weapons master
Any film that uses a prop gun that is a "realistic imitation firearm" should have a weapons master. The weapons master, sometimes credited as the armorer, weapons specialist, weapons handler, weapons wrangler, or weapons coordinator, is a film-crew specialist who works with the propmaster, director, actors, stunt coordinator, and script supervisor. The weapons master is specifically responsible for maintaining control of any prop weapons, including firearms, knives, swords, bows, and staff weapons.

== Costume department ==
Costume designer
The costume designer is responsible for all the clothing and costumes worn by all the actors that appear on screen. They are also responsible for designing, planning, and organizing the construction of the garments down to the fabric, colors, and sizes. The costume designer works closely with the director to understand and interpret "character", and counsels with the production designer to achieve an overall tone of the film. In large productions, the costume designer will usually have one or more assistant costume designers.
Wardrobe supervisor
The costume supervisor works closely with the designer. In addition to helping with the design of the costumes, they manage the wardrobe workspace. They supervise construction or sourcing of garments, hiring and firing of support staff, budget, paperwork, and department logistics. It is also called the wardrobe supervisor, although this term is used less and less.
Key costumer
The key costumer is employed on larger productions to manage the set costumers, and to handle the star's wardrobe needs.
Costume standby
The costume standby is present on set at all times. It is his or her responsibility to monitor the quality and continuity of the actors and actresses costumes before and during takes. she or he will also assist the actors and actresses with dressing.
Breakdown artist
A breakdown artist may be employed during the pre-production period to break down garments. This specialized job includes making new clothing appear dirty, faded, and worn.
Costume buyer
On large productions a buyer may be employed to source and purchase fabrics and garments. A buyer might also be referred to as a shopper. This distinction is often made when the lead actor in a production has control over their wardrobe, and they may personally hire this person.
Cutter
A costume technician who fits or tailors costumes, usually on set. They might also be called fitter, seamstress, or tailor. Some celebrity actors have favorite cutters, and larger productions may hire several and have them on set at the same time, particularly in period film projects that might have complicated or expensive extras wardrobe.

=== Hair and make-up ===
Some actors or actresses have personal makeup artists or hair stylists.

Make-up designer
The makeup designer is the department head that answers directly to the director and production designer. They are responsible for planning makeup designs for all leading and supporting cast. Their department includes all cosmetic makeup, body makeup and if special effects are involved, the makeup designer will consult with a special effects makeup team to create all prosthetics and SFX makeup in a production. It is common that the makeup designer performs makeup applications on lead cast, with assistance, and allows other crew members to work with supporting and minor roles. The designer will normally execute especially complicated or important makeup processes that are to be featured on camera.
Special make-up effects artist (SFX makeup)
A special effects make-up artist works with live models or structures in the entertainment industry, applying make-up effects or prosthetics. May be an own department that answers directly to the director and production designer or reports to the Key make-up artist.
Make-up supervisor
The make-up supervisor is a supporting position that normally reports to the key makeup artist to assist in running the makeup department. Make-up supervisors typically handle production matters and generally serve the needs of senior artists. Makeup supervisors rarely do makeup themselves. Their duties can include keeping a record of makeup continuity, handing the scheduling of makeup teams and providing for the general needs of the makeup department. They are expected to be a connection between the makeup department and the rest of the production departments, making sure that makeup supplies, production assistants or electricians are on hand when needed.
Make-up artist
Make-up artists work with makeup, hair and special effects to create the characters look for anyone appearing on screen. They assist and report to the key make-up artist.
Key hair
The key hair is the department head that answers directly to the director and production designer. The key hair will normally design and style the hair of lead actors.
Hair stylist
The hair stylist is responsible for maintaining and styling the hair, including wigs and extensions, of anyone appearing on screen. They assist and report to the key hair.

== Special effects ==
The special effects department oversees the mechanical effects (also called physical or practical effects) that create optical illusions during live-action shooting. It is not to be confused with the visual effects department, which adds photographic effects during filming to be altered later during video editing in the post-production process.

Special effects supervisor
The special effects supervisor instructs the special effects crew on how to design moving set elements and props that will safely break, explode, burn, collapse and implode without destroying the film set. He or she is also responsible for reproducing weather conditions and other on-camera magic.
Special effects assistant
The SFX assistants carry out the instructions of the special effects supervisor, building set pieces like breakaway furniture and cities in miniature, lighting pyrotechnics, and setting up rigging equipment for stunts.

== Stunts ==
Stunt coordinator
Where the film requires a stunt and involves the use of stunt performers, the stunt coordinator will arrange the casting and performance of the stunt, working closely with the director and the 1st AD.
Set medic
Films and TV programs in general should always have a set or unit medic on set at all times from construction, through filming and to strike but a film unit that has stunts must always have trained senior EMT(A) or Paramedic on Set.

== Post-production ==
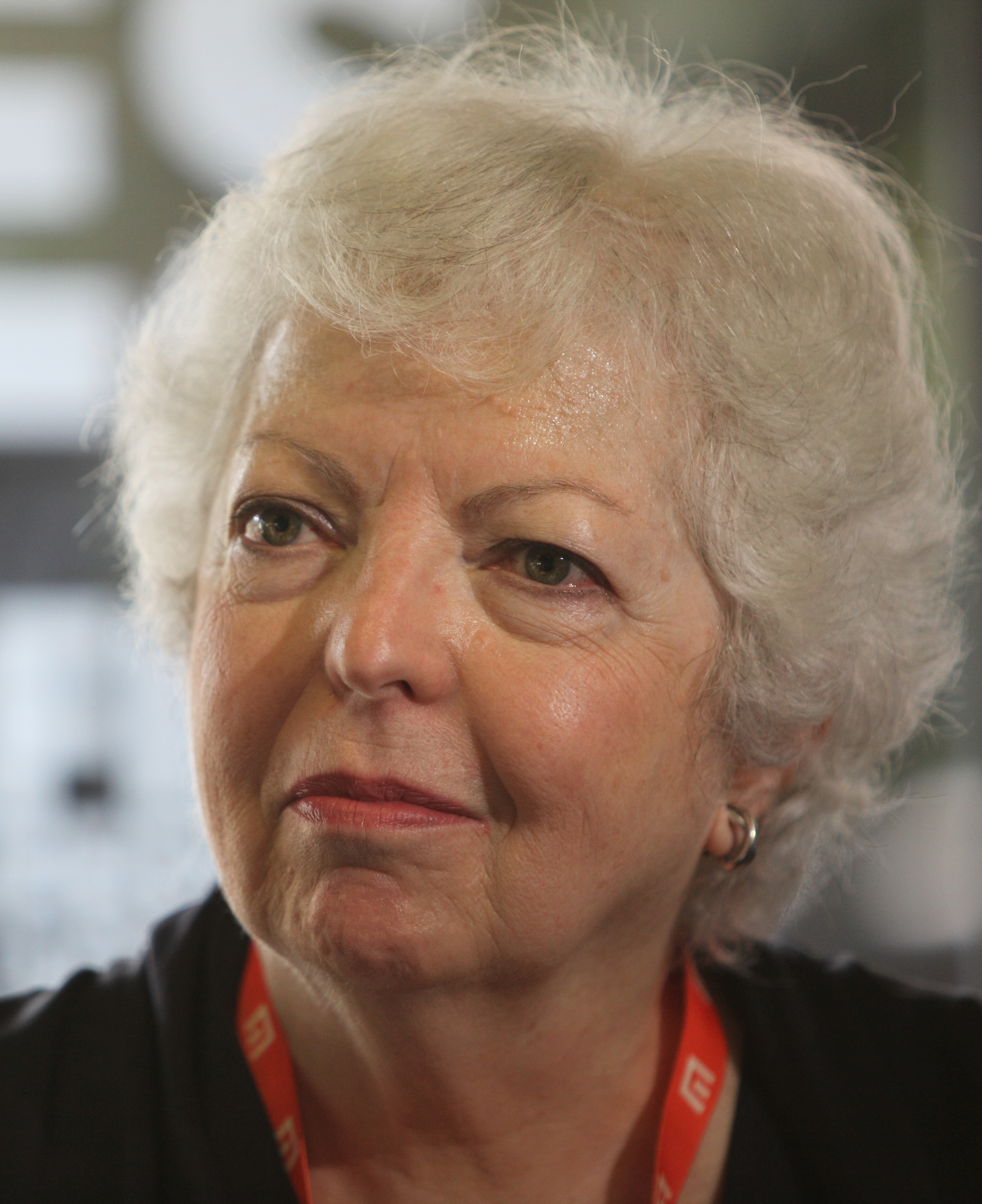
Thelma Schoonmaker, a frequent collaborator on Martin Scorsese films, has received eight Academy Award nominations for Best Film Editing and has won three times—for Raging Bull (1980), The Aviator (2004), and The Departed (2006), which were all Scorsese-directed films.

Film editor
The film editor is the creative head of the post production department and is responsible for assembling the picture into a cohesive edited story, with the help of the director. They are primarily responsible for selecting performances of the actors with the director, adjusting the tempo, pace, and structure of the final edited film. In some cases, the editor may help restructure the story of a film differently from the original script to focus a story point, or increase an emotional response from the audience. They are also involved with providing feedback on the sound mix, visual effects, and music with the director. They can also collaborate with the colorist and director of photography to adjust framing for mood or eye trace. There are usually several assistant editors who creatively support the editor as well as manage footage and data for the entire post production team.
Post-production supervisor
Post-production supervisors are responsible for the post-production process, during which they maintain clarity of information and good channels of communication between the producer, editor, supervising sound editor, the facilities companies (such as film labs, CGI studios and negative cutters) and the production accountant. Although this is not a creative role, it is pivotal in ensuring that the film's post-production budget is manageable and achievable, and that all deadlines are met. Because large amounts of money are involved, and most of a film's budget is spent during production, the post-production period can often be difficult and challenging.

=== Editorial ===
Negative cutter
The negative cutter cuts and splices the negatives as directed by the film editor, and then provides the assembled negative reels to the lab for prints (positives for projection) to be made.
Colorist
With a photochemical process, the color timer adjusts the color of the film via printer lights for greater consistency in the film's colors. With a digital intermediate process, the colorist can use digital tools in manipulating the image and has greater creative freedom in changing the aesthetic of a film.
Telecine colorist
A telecine colorist is responsible for a grade, a look that has been created with a grading system, which adjusts brightness, contrast and color.

=== Visual effects ===
Visual effects commonly refers to post-production alterations of the film's images. The on set VFX crew works to prepare shots and plates for future visual effects. This may include adding tracking markers, taking and asking for reference plates and helping the director understand the limitations and ease of certain shots that will effect the future post production. A VFX crew can also work alongside the special effects department for any on-set optical effects that need physical representation during filming (on camera).

Visual effects producer
The visual effects producer works with the visual effects supervisor to break down the script into storyboards, and advises the director as to how she or he should approach the scenes. Together they determine which sequences are to be shot as live action elements, which would work well in miniature, and which (if any) should be computer generated.
Visual effects creative director
VFX creative directors are very much like production designers, except they direct and supervise the creative side of the film's visual effects. The position is particularly in demand for films with massive amounts of computer generated imagery and scenes.
Visual effects supervisor
The visual effects supervisor is in charge of the VFX crew, working with production and the film's director to achieve the desired in-camera optical effects of the film.
Visual effects editor
The visual effects editor incorporates visual effects into the current cuts of live action sequences, producing multiple versions of each shot. Altered scenes are then evaluated by the visual effects supervisor and creative director for aesthetic and technical direction, and by the producers for review and final editing.
Compositor
A compositor is a visual effects artist responsible for compositing images from different sources such as video, film, computer generated 3D imagery, 2D animations, matte paintings, photographs, and text.
Rotoscope artists/Paint artists
Rotoscope and paint artists may rotoscope the footage, manually creating mattes for use in compositing. They may also paint visual information into or out of a scene, such as removing wires and rigs, logos, dust busting, scratch removal, etc.
Matte painter
Matte painters draw and paint entire sets or extend portions of an existing set.

=== Sound and music ===
Sound designer
The sound designer, or supervising sound editor, is in charge of the post-production sound of a movie. Sometimes this may involve great creative license, and other times it may simply mean working with the director and editor to balance the sound to their liking.
Dialogue editor
The dialogue editor is responsible for assembling and editing all the dialog in the soundtrack.
Sound editor
The sound editor is responsible for assembling and editing all the sound effects in the soundtrack.
Re-recording mixer
The re-recording mixer balances all of the sounds prepared by the dialogue, music and effects editors, and finalizes the film's audio track.
Music supervisor
The music supervisor works with the composer, mixers and editors to create and integrate the film's music. In Hollywood, a music supervisor's primary responsibility is to act as liaison between the film production and the recording industry, negotiating the use rights for all source music used in a film.
Composer
The composer is responsible for writing the musical score for a film.
Foley artist
The foley artist is the person who creates the post-sync sound effects for a film. These sound effects are recorded in sync to picture and are mostly body movements, footsteps or object manipulations. The most common reason for recording these effects live to picture is the fact that such sounds are lost when the dialogue is removed to be replaced by a foreign-language version. Unsatisfactorily recorded sync sound effects can also be replaced with foley effects. Foley artists are also known as foley walkers. Foley is named after its first known practitioner, an early Hollywood sound editor named Jack Foley.
Conductor / Orchestrator
A conductor is supposed to be knowledgeable of special synchronization procedures to conduct the score to an orchestra. An orchestrator is someone who furthers the composer's notes and symbols and fills out the intended notation for the film score.
Score recorder / mixer
A score's recorder is someone who records the film score and a score's mixer is someone who mixes the film score.
Music preparation
A music preparer is someone who prepares out the score for orchestra performers and who copies out the music.
Music editor
A music editor is someone who edits the film score and works with the composer to make sure it goes with the film.
Additional orchestration
Additional orchestration people work with the conductor and orchestrator, and edit the film score.

== Previsualization ==
Previsualization (also known as previs, previz, pre-rendering, preview, or wireframe windows) is the visualizing of complex scenes in a film before filming. It is also a concept in still photography. It is also used to describe techniques such as storyboarding, either in the form of charcoal sketches or in digital technology, in the planning and conceptualization of film scenes.

== Animation ==
Animation film crews have many of the same roles and departments as live-action films (including directing, production, editing, camera, sound, etc.), but nearly all on-set departments (lighting, electrical, grip, sets, props, costume, hair, makeup, special effects, and stunts) were traditionally replaced with a single animation department made up of various types of animators (character, effects, in-betweeners, cleanup, etc.). In traditional animation, the nature of the medium meant that everything was literally flattened into the drawn lines and solid colors that became the characters, making nearly all live-action positions irrelevant. Because animation has traditionally been so labor-intensive and thus expensive, animation films normally have a separate story department in which storyboard artists painstakingly develop scenes to make sure they make sense before they are actually animated.

However, since the turn of the 21st century, modern 3D computer graphics and computer animation have made possible a level of rich detail never seen before. Many animated films now have specialized artists and animators who act as the virtual equivalent of lighting technicians, grips, costume designers, props masters, set decorators, set dressers, and cinematographers. They make artistic decisions strongly similar to those of their live-action counterparts, but implement them in a virtual space that exists only in software rather than on a physical set. There have been major breakthroughs in the simulation of hair since 2005, meaning that hairstylists have been called in since then to consult on a few animation projects.

== See also ==
- Cinematography
- Outline of film
- Production team
- Television crew
- Glossary of motion picture terms
