= Art department =

Section of a film's production crew

Art department in filmmaking terms means the section of a production's crew concerned with visual artistry. Working under the supervision of the production designer and/or art director, the art department is responsible for arranging the overall look of the film (i.e. modern/high-tech, rustic, Victorian, etc.) as desired by the film director. Individual positions within this department include: production designer, art director, assistant art director, storyboard artist, concept artist, draftsman, art department coordinator, set decorator, set dresser, makeup artist, painter, property master, leadman, swing gang, production buyer, Film sculptor, and property assistant.
