= Staging (theatre, film, television) =

Manipulation of a performance space

Staging is the process of selecting, designing, adapting to, or modifying the performance space for a play or film. This includes the use or absence of stagecraft elements as well as the structure of the stage and its components.

Staging is also used to mean the result of this process, in other words the spectacle that a play presents in performance, its visual detail. This can include such things as positions of actors on stage (often referred to as blocking), their gestures and movements (also called stage business), the scenic background, the props and costumes, lighting, and sound effects. Besides costume, any physical object that appears in a play has the potential to become an important dramatic symbol. The first thing that the audience of a play sees is the stage set, the physical objects that suggest the world of the play. The stage set is usually indicated by the playwright, but the degree of detail and specificity of this rendering vary from one playwright to another and from one literary period to another. In film, staging is generally called set dressing.

While from a critical standpoint, "staging" can refer to the spectacle that a play presents in performance, the term is also frequently used interchangeably with the term "blocking", referring to how the performers are placed and moved around the stage. Major points of blocking are often set down by the playwright, but blocking is usually done by the director, sometimes in collaboration with performers and designers. In the modern theater, there are purely mechanical reasons why blocking is crucial. Stage lighting is focused on specific parts of the stage at specific moments, and the performer must be sure to be on his or her "mark" or "spike" or they may not be well lit. Blocking also ensures that the stage picture gives the proper focus to the proper places, and that transitions occur smoothly. This becomes even more crucial as modern stage technology allows for ever more elaborate special effects.

When Twentieth Century Fox introduced wide-screen CinemaScope format, the head of production Darryl Zanuck repeatedly reminded his directors to take full advantage of the screen width by staging action all the way across the frame - in his words, 'keep the people spread out'. He wanted the audience to experience the full width of the new screen shape. The 'washing line' staging demanded by Zanuck not only was a commercial imperative, it also was a practical solution for the lack of color film sensitivity as well for inability to employ deep staging.

== See also ==
- Set construction
- Set dresser
