= Music video director =

Person who directs the music artist, the actors and film crew in making music videos

A music video director is the head, overseer or facilitator of music video production. The director conceives of videos' artistic and dramatic aspects while instructing the musical act, technical crew, actors, models, and dancers. They may or may not be in collaboration with the musical act.

"The case for the director as music video author is strong. It is the music video director who has principal control of everything that is added to the pre-existing recorded sound text."

== See also ==
- Musical film
- Videography
