= Scenic painting (theatre) =

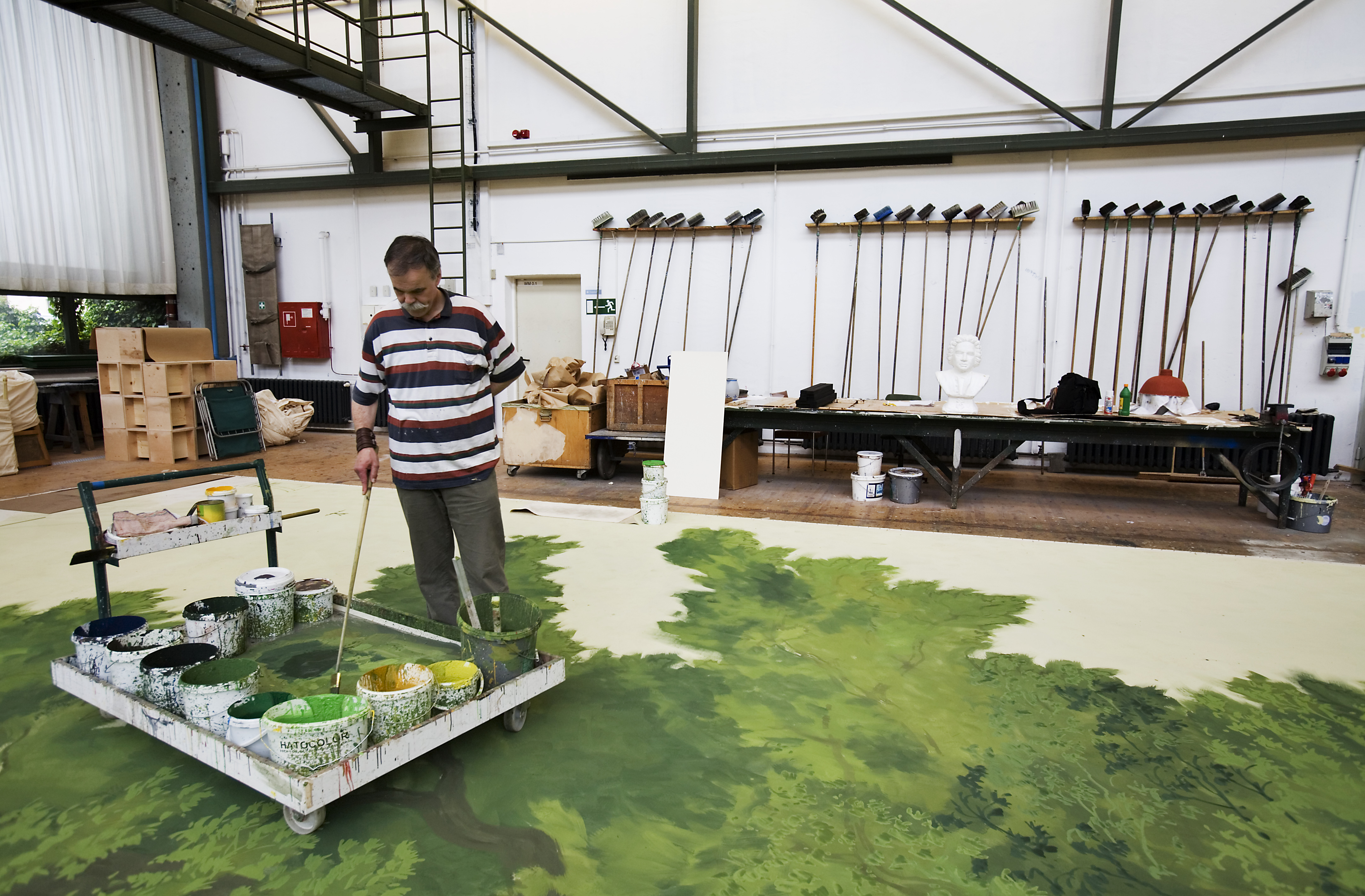
A scenic painter at work at the Semperoper in Dresden, Germany

Theatrical scenic painting is a discipline within theatrical production that includes creating scenery or backdrops by adding textures and depth. It encompasses a range of techniques, including landscape painting, figurative painting, trompe-l'œil, and faux finishing. Scenic painters work with a range of media such as acrylic, oil, and tempera paint. In addition, Three-dimensional skills such as sculpting, plastering and gilding may be applied to achieve specific effects. Paint composition knowledge is often necessary when selecting appropriate materials during painting.

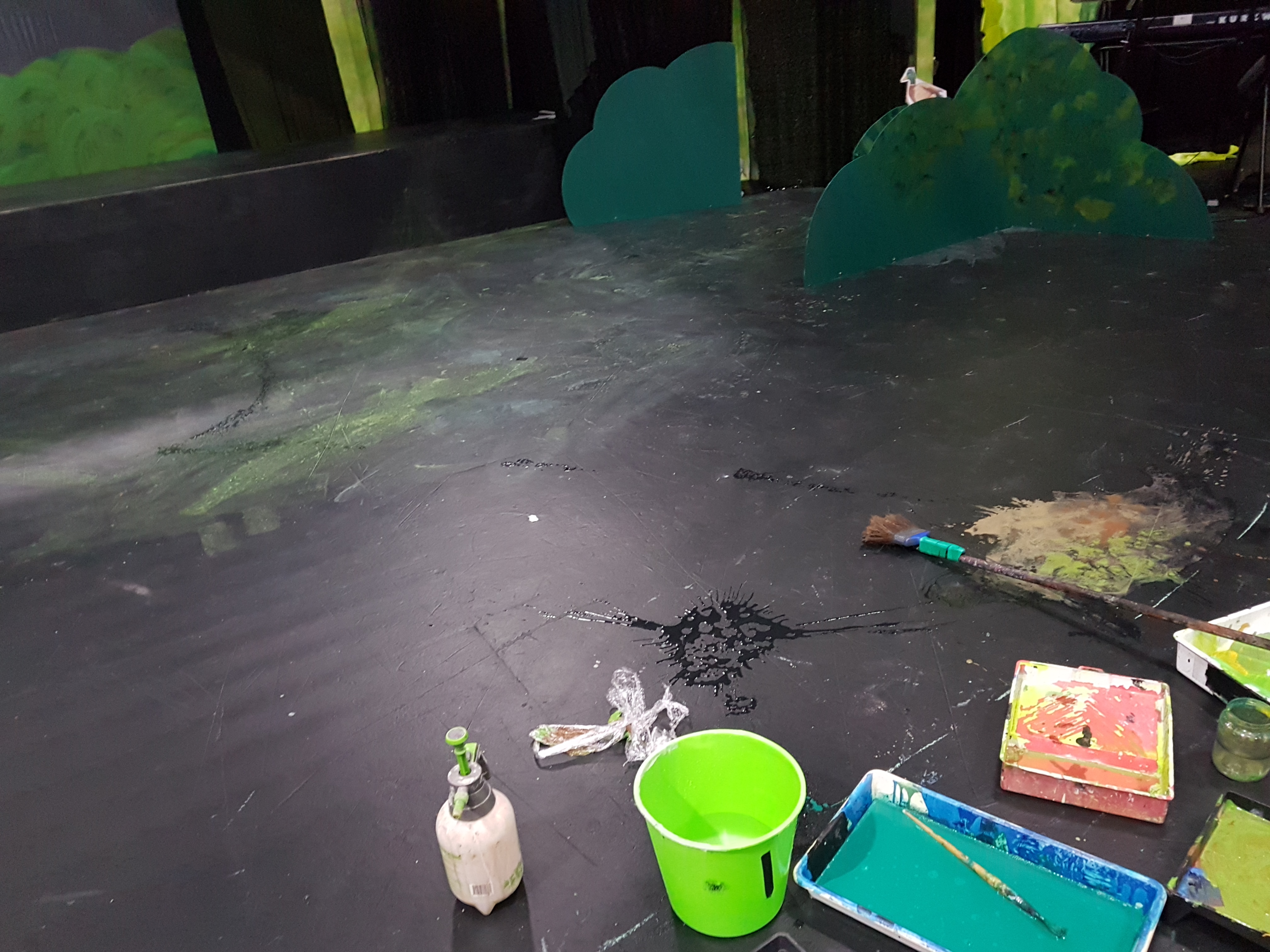
Preparation for painting the stage floor at Circa Theatre for the pantomime Puss in Boot

A scenic painter is responsible for replicating an image to a larger scale from a designer's maquette. This process uses reference materials such as photographs, printouts, and original research. Paint and style samples may also be provided to guide the work. While scenic painters usually execute the designs under the direction of a scenic or theatre designer, in some cases designers carry out their own scenic painting. Custom tools are often created to achieve specific visual effects.

== History ==
The origin of scenic painting traces back to the Italian Renaissance, when Leon Battista Alberti studied and documented aspects from Ancient Greece stage painting, associated with the time of Aeschylus. During and after the Renaissance, the ability to draw in linear perspective became a fundamental skill for scenic painters. It allowed them to create realistic spatial illusions.

The profession of scenic painting emerged during the Restoration period, when the use of visuals became a main experience to performances. Painters specialized in scenic painting were employed to create elaborate environments.

In the late 19th century, scenic artists gained a reputation for producing detailed and expressive backdrops. This became a prominent visual feature for theatrical productions. Productions often included backdrops with real-world environments such as streets and landscapes because of the theatrical movement toward realism. Audiences expected scenery to support storytelling and natural acting, having realistic scene painting creates an immersive world.

However, as the rise of modern stage design began in the early 20th century, painted scenery became viewed as outdated. Modernism influenced theatrical painting by adding abstract and symbolic methods into staging.

Scenic painters have also adapted throughout the modern era. Digital printing technologies allowed for larger scaled scenic elements to be produced at a faster pace, but scenic painting is used to enhance textures, color variations, and finishing effects that are difficult for machines to make. Contemporary scenic painters blend traditional and digital methods to meet the needs of diverse styles.

Despite the changes, the practice of scenic painting has evolved and remains an important part of theatrical production. Scenic painting is used in traditional theatre, opera, musical theatre, where visual storytelling is heavily relied on.

== Scenic paint ==
Scenic paint has traditionally been mixed by scenic painters using pigment powder, a binder and a medium. The binder allows the pigment to adhere to itself and to the surface, while the medium, typically water, thins the mix for application and evaporates when the paint dries. The mix helps painters change the consistency and finish for specific materials.

Today, ready-made scenic paint has become highly used and available. The products contain pigment suspended in a medium and require adding a binder when used. Commercial paints are used for consistency in color, handling, and finish, which help in large backdrops and textures. Some scenic paintings use digital printing and combine hand painting to restore dimensions.

In educational theatre programs, scenic painting is fundamental. Students are introduced to both traditional and modern mixing techniques and paint products.

== Tools and techniques ==
There are a variety of tools and methods used to create textures, patterns, and large scale imagery for theatre productions. Common tools are wide brushes, rollers, sponges, sprayers, and custom built tools that are meant to achieve specific effects. Items such as stencils and projectors are used to transfer and enlarge images from a designer's maquette onto full scale scenic surfaces.

Foundational techniques include scumbling, spattering, dry brushing, and rag rolling. These help produce visual effects from a distance or under lighting conditions.These practices are introduced during educational theatre programs, where students are guided to use them on different materials.
