= Leadman =

A leadman is a set decoration department member who is responsible for the props and swing gang and/or set dressers on a film set. The swing gang does the set dressing and then removal once the film has wrapped. Set dressers keep the set in the proper condition by placing and moving elements and props as needed for the story, continuity, and to make room for the filming equipment. The leadman takes directions from the set decorator.
