= Set construction =

Creation of scenery for theater, film, or TV

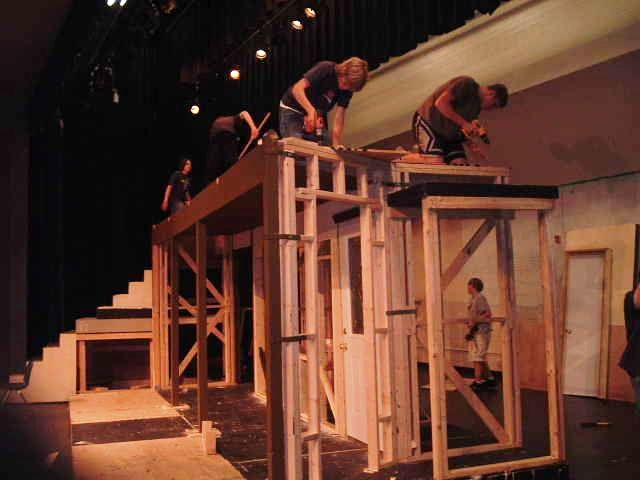
Carpenters work on constructing the set

Set construction is the process undertaken by a construction manager to build full-scale scenery, as specified by a production designer or art director working in collaboration with the director of a production to create a set for a theatrical, film, or television production. The set designer produces a scale model, scale drawings, paint elevations (a scale painting supplied to the scenic painter of each element that requires painting), and research about props, textures, and so on. Scale drawings typically include a ground plan, elevation, and section of the complete set, as well as more detailed drawings of individual scenic elements which, in theatrical productions, may be static, flown, or built onto scenery wagons. Models and paint elevations are frequently hand-produced, though in recent years, many Production Designers and most commercial theatres have begun producing scale drawings with the aid of computer drafting programs such as AutoCAD or Vectorworks.

== Theater ==
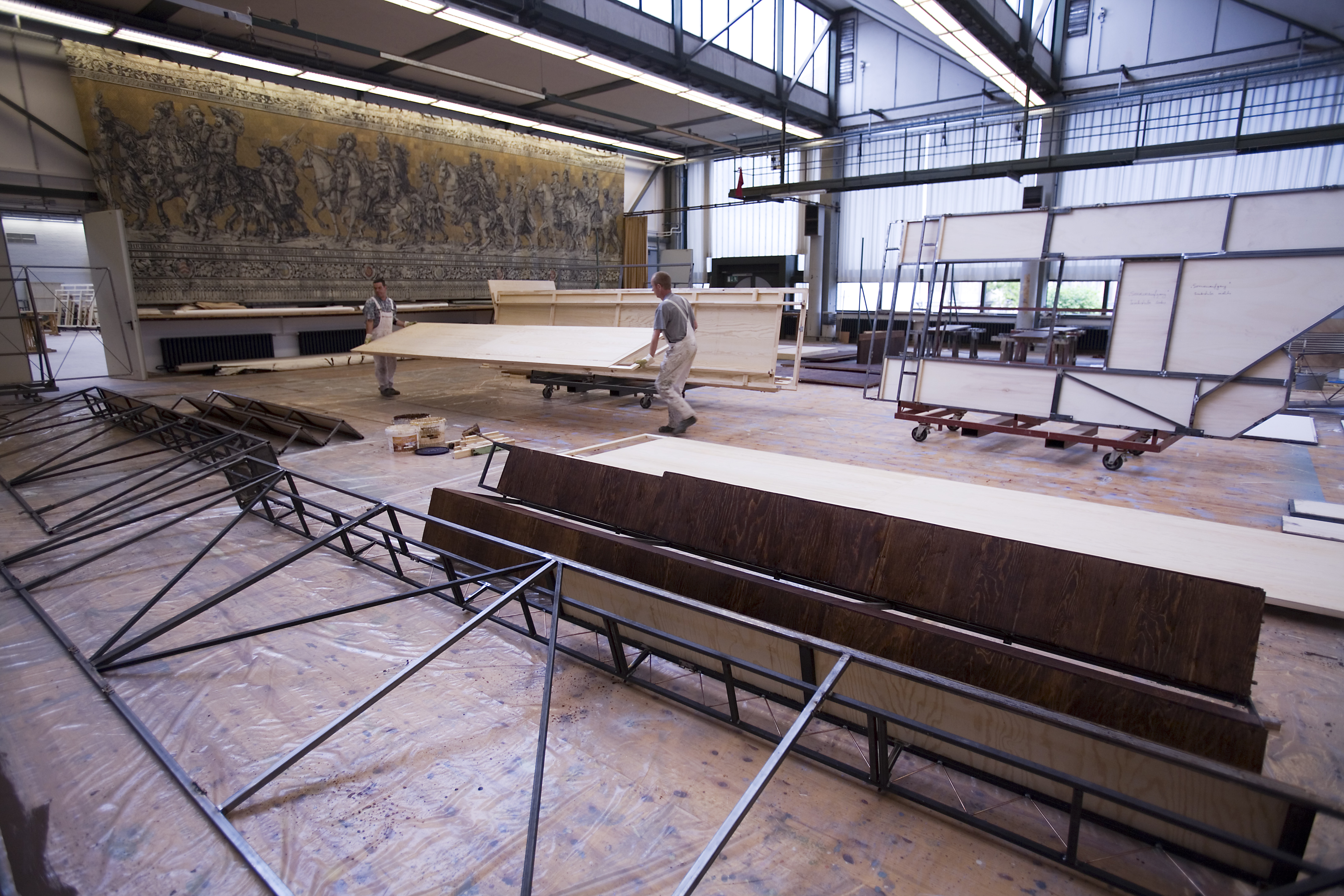
A set under construction at the Semperoper in Dresden, Germany.

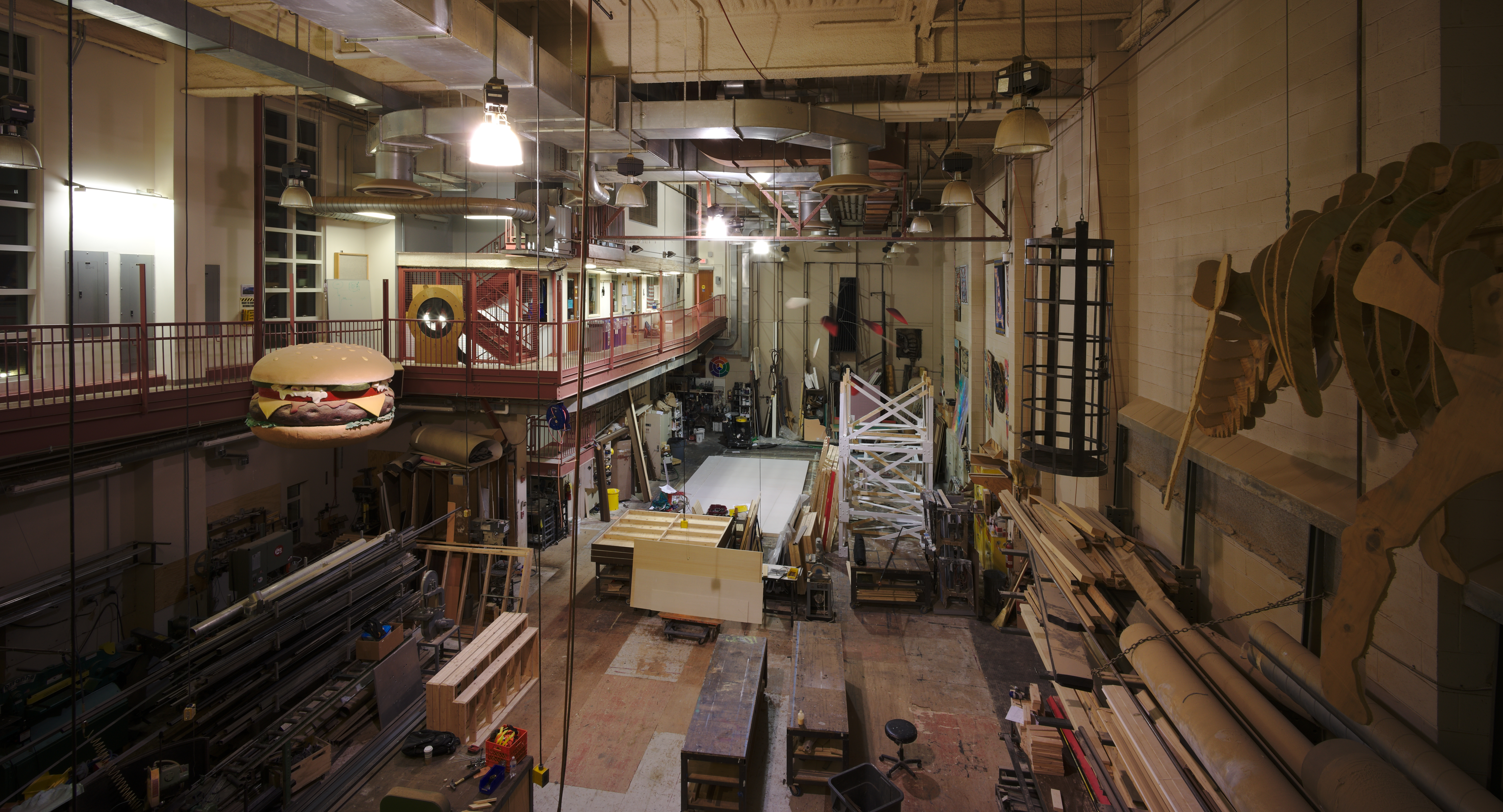
Set construction at the Carnegie Mellon School of Drama.

In theater, the technical director or production manager is the person responsible for evaluating the finished designs and considering budget and time limitations. They engineer the scenery, has it redrafted for building, budgets time, crew and materials, and liaisons between the designer and the shop. Technical directors often have assistant technical directors whose duties can range from drafting to actually building scenery.

A scene shop, in theatrical production is often overseen by a shop foreman or master carpenter. This person assigns tasks, does direct supervision of carpenters, and deals with day-to-day matters such as absences, breaks, and tool repair. They are in charge of making sure the set is safe for actors to work on. The staff of a scene shop is usually referred to as scenic carpenters, but within that there are many specialties such as plasterers, welders, machinists and scenic stitchers. Scenic painting is a separate aspect of scenic construction, although the scenic painter usually answers to the scenic charge who usually answers to the technical director.

== Film production ==
In major film production in England, a Supervising Art Director is responsible for a team of Art Directors, each drafting separate sets or sections of a single set. Construction supervisors interpret the drawings and allocate labour and resources, with the Production Designer giving approval of the finished set on the Directors behalf. Film construction is rigidly compartmentalized on major motion pictures.

Construction of a set is mainly done on studio stages or back lots, often within a studio complex and several studio stages may be allocated purely as workshop space during the construction process. Many disciplines are employed under construction managers but craftsmen tend to not multi-task and so there are a range of job titles such as carpenter, rigger, plasterer, stage hand, poly waller, scenic painter, standby painter and standby carpenter. A prop making workshop is set up in a similar stage and may be paid for out of a Construction or Art Department budget depending on the nature and size of the props in question.

The construction department is led by a construction coordinator. The coordinator reports to the art director and production designer and is in charge of budgeting and implementing designs. The construction coordinator has a general foreman to assist. Next there are other foremen, lead carpenters called gang bosses, and then all of the carpenters and craftsmen.

The construction coordinator, or construction company, provides all tools and equipment apart from small hand tools specific to a craftsman's work, such as screw guns, paint brushes and plastering trowels. This makes logistics and efficiency the responsibility of the construction manager and leaves each crew member as fluid freelancers to be hired and off hired at extremely short notice throughout the production.

Studio complexes tend to have support services such as Drape Shops, general stores, timber stores and plaster shop as well as special effects companies, on site to support construction and other departments.

In the United States, set construction workers are usually members of the entertainment union, IATSE, International Alliance of Theatrical Stage Employees.

== See also ==
- Sound stage
- Stagecraft
- Staging (theatre)
- Theatrical scenery
- Film sculptor
