= Michael Stringer =

English painter (1924–2004)

- Born: 26 July 1924; Singapore
- Died: 7 March 2004 (aged 79); Eastbourne, England
- Occupation: Production designer
- Years active: 1952–1990

John Michael Stringer (26 July 1924 – 7 March 2004) was a film production designer, art director, painter and illustrator.

Stringer's work as art director on Fiddler on the Roof (1971), involving much shooting in Yugoslavia, earned him an Academy Award nomination shared with the Hollywood production designer Robert Boyle and set decorator Peter Lamont, but they lost to Nicholas and Alexandra. His later assignments included The Greek Tycoon (1978), The Awakening (1980), The Mirror Crack'd (1980), and The Jigsaw Man (1983) before he moved into television with excellent sets for the Ian Richardson version of The Hound of the Baskervilles (1983). He designed the TV series Paradise Postponed (1986) and, as in the earlier Inspector Clouseau, his resemblance to Harold Wilson led to his making a cameo appearance as the former prime minister.

Stringer explained much about art direction generally and his own approach, in contributing to a textbook, Film Design (1974), when he was President of the Guild of Film Art Directors (Now known as the British Film Designers Guild British Film Designers Guild.)

== Selected filmography ==
=== Production Designer ===
- An Alligator Named Daisy (1955)
- The Secret Place (1957)
- Windom's Way (1957)
- The Sundowners (1960)
- 633 Squadron (1964)
- A Shot in the Dark (1964)
- Return from the Ashes (1965)
- Cast a Giant Shadow (1966)
- Casino Royale (1967)
- Inspector Clouseau (1968)
- Alfred the Great (1969)
- Toomorrow (1970)
- Demons of the Mind (1972)
- Alice's Adventures in Wonderland (1972)
- Robin and Marian (1976)
- Gulliver's Travels (1977)
- The Greek Tycoon (1978)
- The Awakening (1980)
- The Mirror Crack'd (1980)
- The Jigsaw Man (1983)
- The Hound of the Baskervilles (1983) (TV)
- From the Hip (1987)
- Return from the River Kwai (1989)
- Anything to Survive (1990)

=== Art Director ===
- The Brave Don't Cry (1952)
- Genevieve (1953)
- Background (1953)
- Devil on Horseback (1954)
- For Better, for Worse (1954)
- As Long as They're Happy (1955)
- Jumping for Joy (1956)
- Sea Fury (1958)
- The Captain's Table (1959)
- Tarzan's Greatest Adventure (1959)
- Greyfriars Bobby (1961)
- In Search of the Castaways (1962)
- The Three Lives of Thomasina (1963)
- Young Cassidy (1965)
- Fiddler on the Roof (1971)
- One of Our Dinosaurs Is Missing (1975)
