= Construction buyer =

Purchasers of materials required for a construction project

Construction buyers are the purchasers of materials required for a construction project, in which they purchase the products in accordance with the established budgets. Buyers are crucial in ensuring that the construction contract remains profitable, and that the most cost effective materials are used to lower outlays. In the construction industry construction buyers play a key role in the overall profitability of a project, due to fluctuations in the cost of raw materials required. A construction buyer will seek quotes on prices and availability of materials from a variety of suppliers, and manage and report on the cumulative cost of all new purchases. Also required of a buyer is ensuring that all materials comply with health and safety guidelines, and that the project estimator is fully briefed on the cost of materials.

== Remuneration ==
In 2010 salaries for construction buyers were on average £38,233 across all sectors of the construction and built environment industry, however contracts for energy sites were considerably higher, averaging £48,733. Buyers have to take control of budgets for the different contracts that they are given, and often bonuses reflect the size of the project. A 2010 survey showed that job security was considered as one of the most important factors for 72.76% of those surveyed.
