= Greensman =

A greensman or greensperson or nurseryman or greenskeeper or greens foreman is any production personnel on a film set who is responsible for obtaining and taking care of anything "green" or natural used in the film production. This may include plants, grass, trees, flowers, and other various landscaping materials like rocks, gravel, sand, etc. They are considered part of the art department. The role includes the use of artificial materials such as simulated rocks, silk flowers and items representing greens, such as camouflage netting.

The greensperson functions as a participant in the filmmaking process as an extension of the art department during set construction and in conjunction with the camera department during filming. In addition to set construction, greenspeople often work "on set" assisting the camera team and other departments in adjusting the set to the changing demands of different camera positions and lighting setups, as requested by the creative leaders.

The range of duties in this category ranges from tending to plant nursery operations (watering, fertilizing, transplanting grass, flowers, bushes, etc.) through to the artful crafting of vines, trees, flowers and the like using cut living material and/or various simulated materials.
