= Film sculptor =

A film sculptor works within the art department of a feature film.

Their skills can be used to create various items, from giant landscape rocks or oversized stone blocks on a castle facade, to statuary and ornate panelling, as well as specialized pieces like vehicle hulls for fantasy films used in set construction. The material often used for large-scale rocks or columns is polystyrene because it is lightweight and can be easily carved with a hot wire. Polystyrene can also be used to sculpt mid-sized items that are difficult to build in wood and too large for clay. For example, a molded chair can be cast in plaster and reproduced in fibre-glass. Clay modeling is preferable for items requiring detailed work and is typically used for smaller, finer pieces.

== Film sculptors ==
- Keith Short
- John Blakeley
- Sam Demke
