= Swing gang =

People who make last-minute changes on a film set

In film-making, a swing gang is one or more persons who make last-minute changes on a film set. This may include construction of new portions of a set the director requests or simply striking large furniture at a set decorator's request. The swing gang is part of the set dressing department. Sets that are not part of the "permanent" sets are called swing set. They come and go as the scripts dictate. Thus the crew that handles the set dressing elements are called the swing gang. These sets may need to be struck during the late evening or the "swing shift".
