= Set (film and TV scenery) =

Artificially constructed location

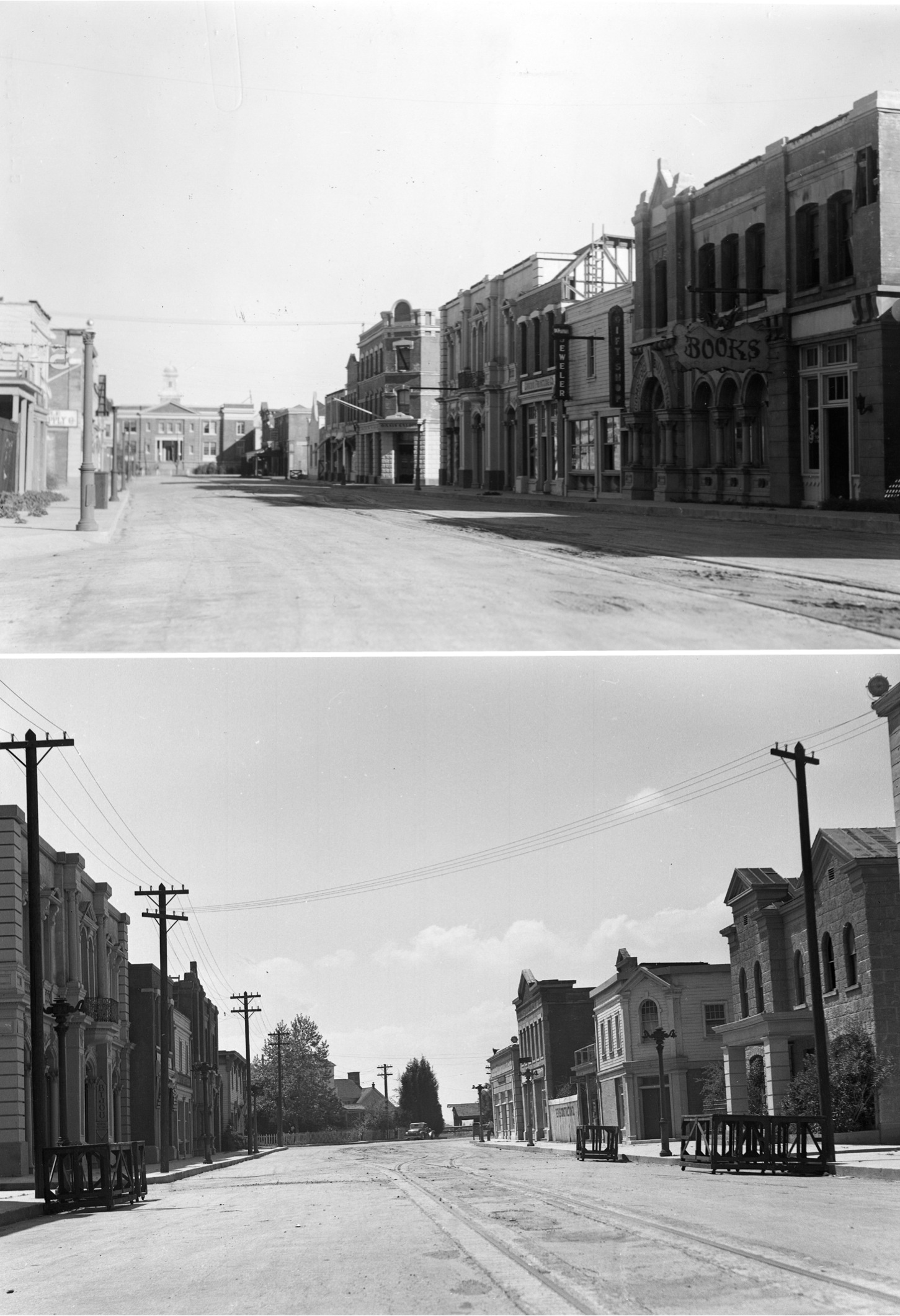
RKO Studios Encino, "Bedford Falls" used in Frank Capra's "It's a Wonderful Life", 1946, small town layout.

A set is artificially constructed scenery used in film and television. In the last two cases there are many reasons to build or use a set instead of travelling to a real location, such as budget, time, the need to control the environment, or the fact that the place does not exist. Sets are normally constructed on a film studio backlot or sound stage, but any place that has been modified to give the feel of another place is a set.

== Gallery ==
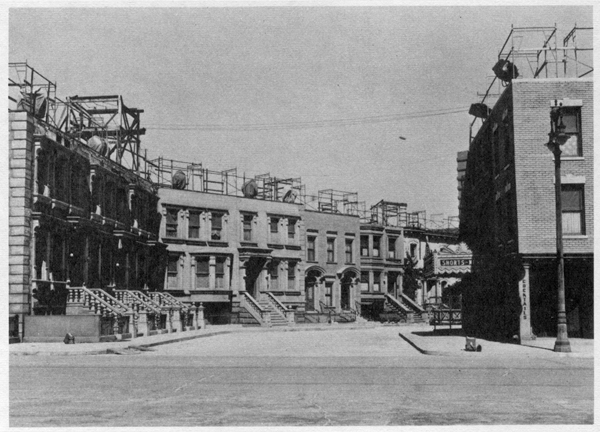
New York Street at the former Columbia Ranch Burbank California

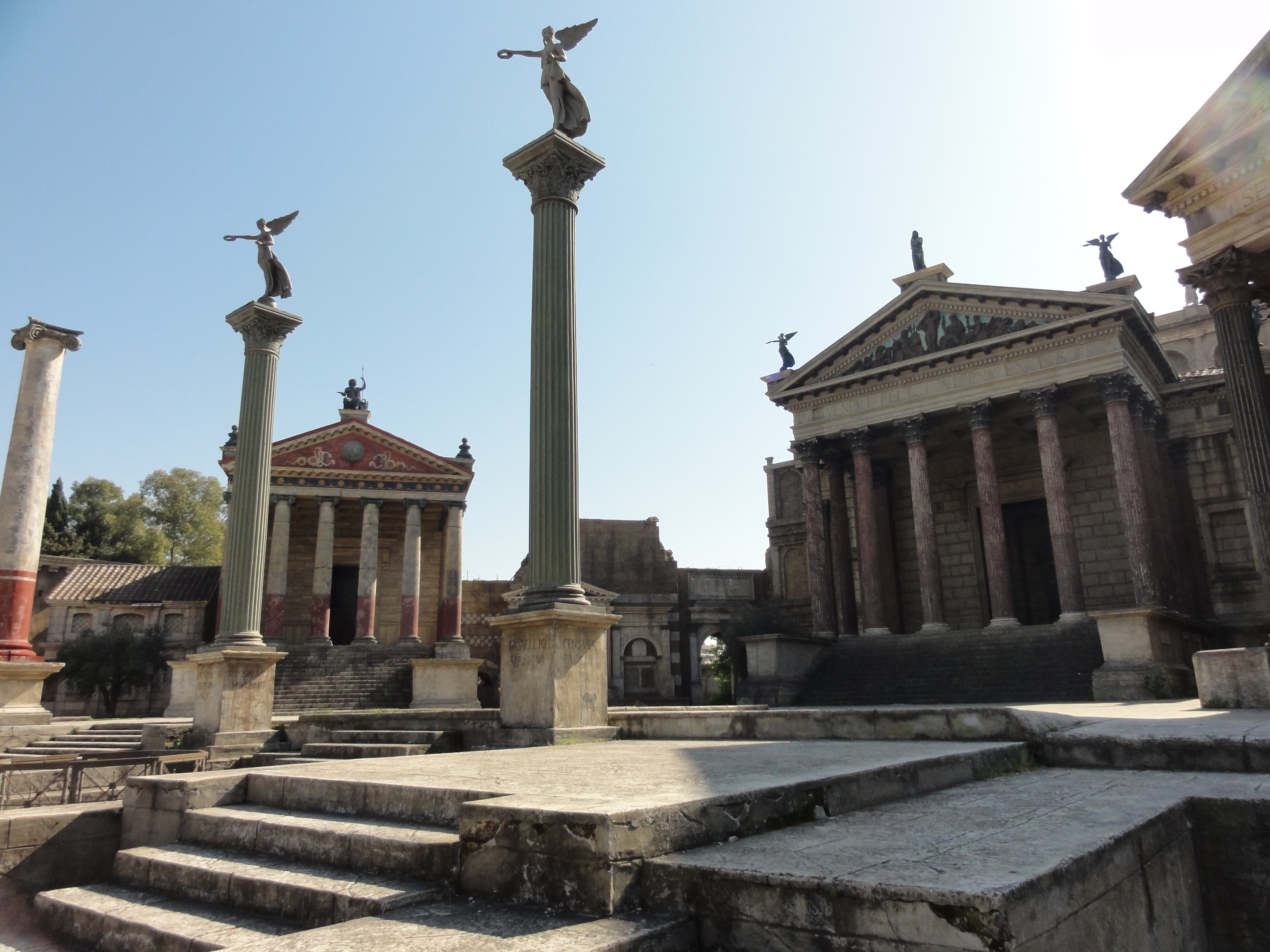
Ancient Rome set at Cinecittà Studios.

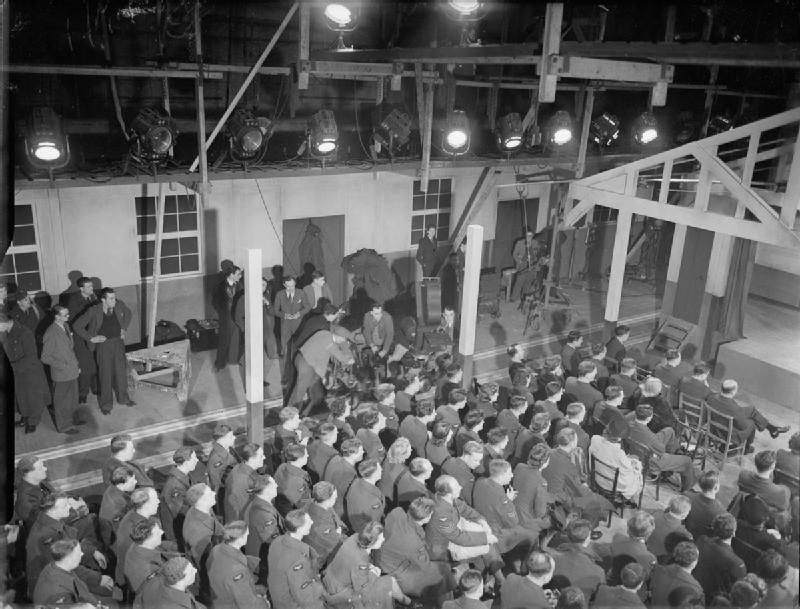
"Coastal Command " a production set on a soundstage at Pinewood Studios, Iver Heath, Buckinghamshire, March 1942

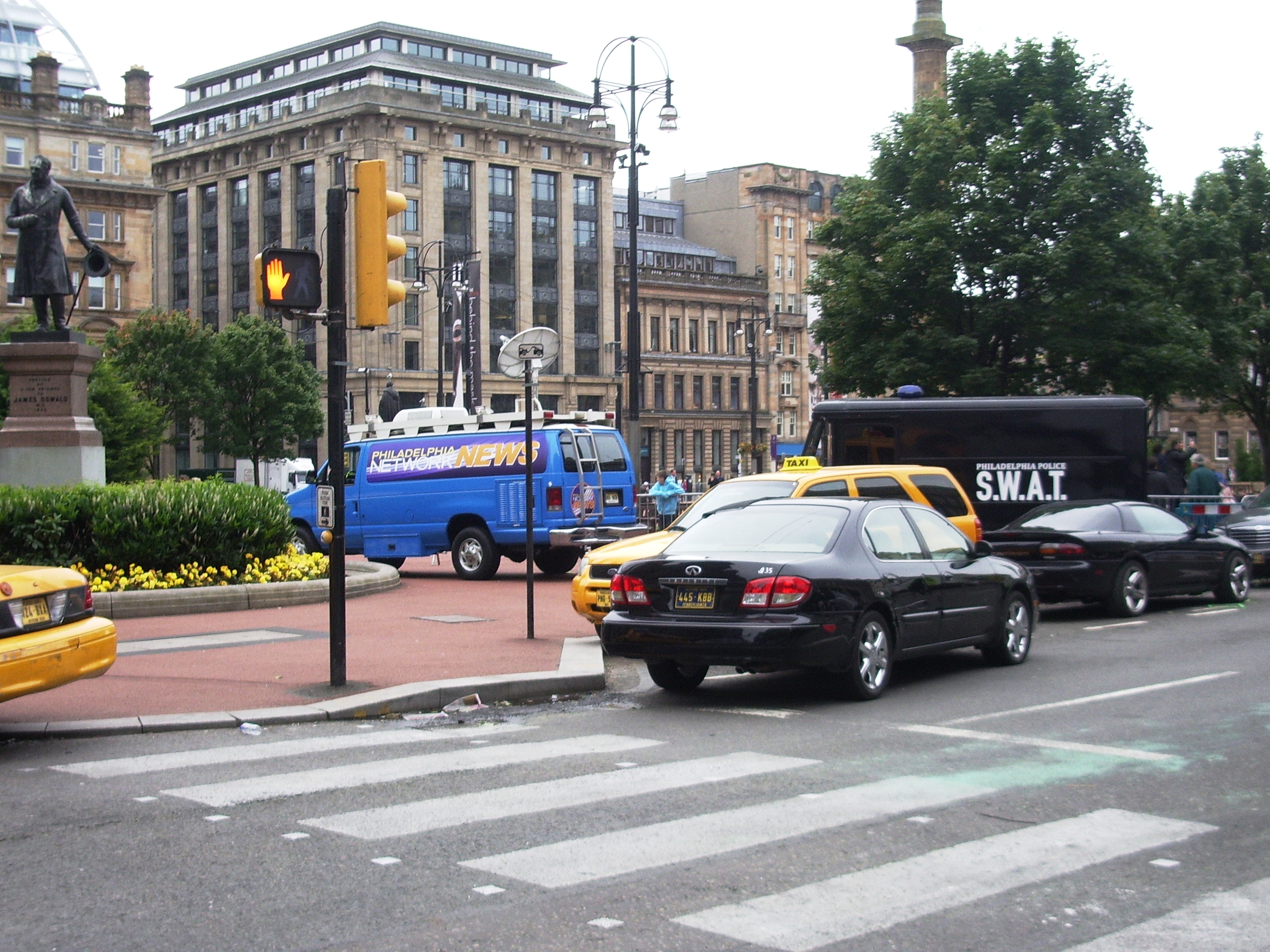
Glasgow city centre dressed as Philadelphia for the Brad Pitt feature World War Z in 2011

== See also ==
- Location shooting
- Theatrical scenery
- Set construction
