= Theatrical scenery =

Space used as a setting for a theatrical production

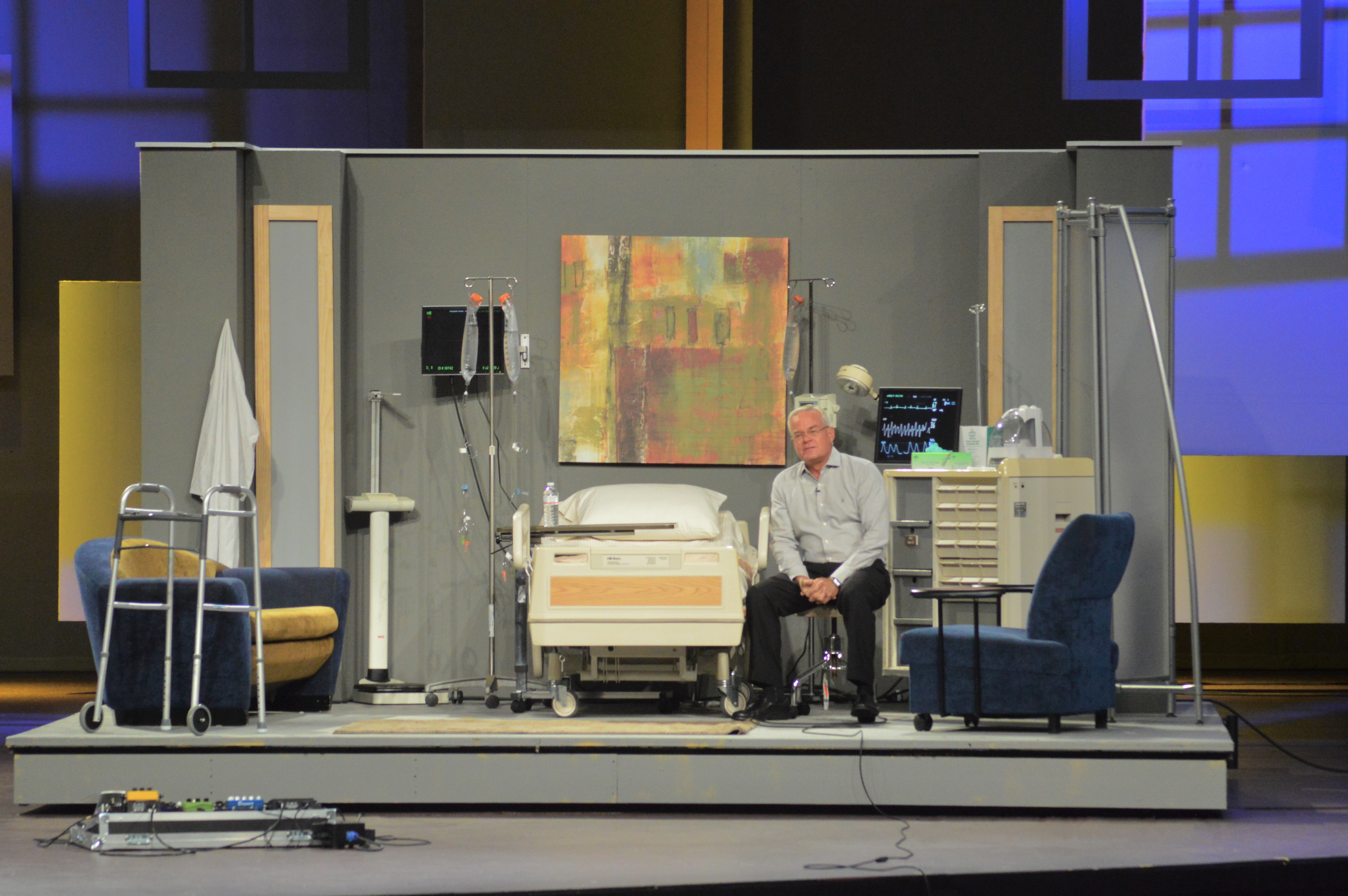
Scenery for a realistic hospital scene, with props

Theatrical scenery is that which is used as a setting for a theatrical production. Scenery may be just about anything, from a single chair to an elaborately re-created street, no matter how large or how small, whether the item was custom-made or is the genuine item, appropriated for theatrical use.

== History ==
The history of theatrical scenery is as old as the theatre itself, and just as obtuse and tradition bound. What we tend to think of as 'traditional scenery', i.e. two-dimensional canvas-covered 'flats' painted to resemble a three-dimensional surface or vista, is a relatively recent innovation and a significant departure from the more ancient forms of theatrical expression, which tended to rely less on the actual representation of space and more on the conveyance of action and mood. By the Shakespearean era, the occasional painted backdrop or theatrical prop was in evidence, but the show itself was written so as not to rely on such items to convey itself to the audience. However, this means that today's set designers must be that much more careful, so as to convey the setting without taking away from the actors.

== Contemporary scenery ==
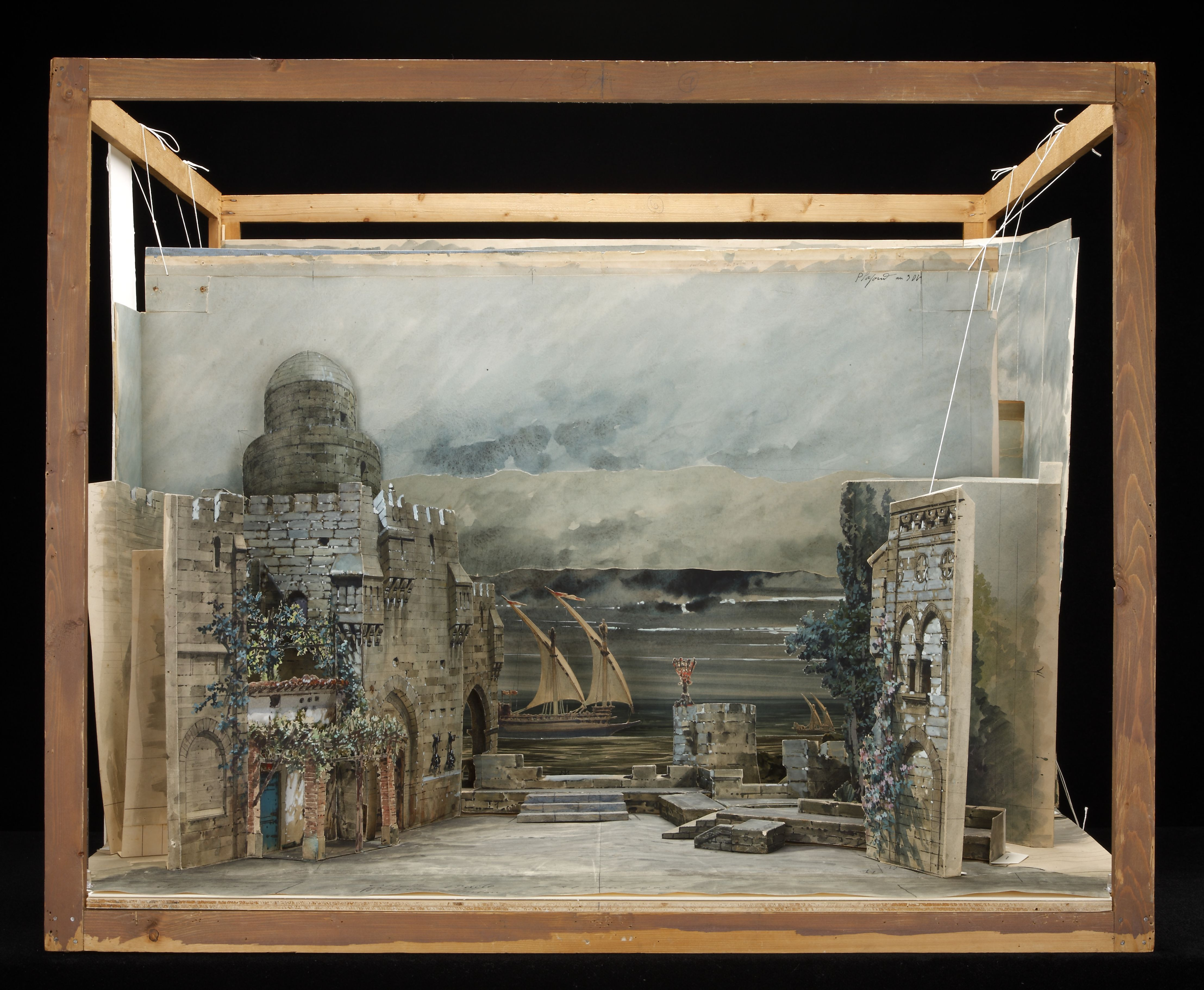
1895 set design model by Marcel Jambon for Act I of Giuseppe Verdi's Otello for a production in Paris.

The more modern notion of scenery, which dates back to the 19th century, finds its origins in the dramatic spectacle of opera buffa, from which the modern opera is descended. Its elaborate settings were appropriated by the 'straight', or dramatic, theatre, through their use in comic operettas, burlesques, pantomimes and the like. As time progressed, stage settings grew more realistic, reaching their peak in the Belasco realism of the 1910-'20s, in which complete diners, with working soda fountains and freshly made food, were recreated onstage. Perhaps as a reaction to such excess and in parallel with trends in the arts and architecture, scenery began a trend towards abstraction, although realistic settings remained in evidence, and are still used today. At the same time, the musical theatre was evolving its own set of scenic traditions, borrowing heavily from the burlesque and vaudeville style, with occasional nods to the trends of the 'straight' theatre. Everything came together in the 1980s and 1990s and, continuing to today, until there is no established style of scenic production and pretty much anything goes. Modern stagecraft has grown so complex as to require the highly specialized skills of hundreds of artists and craftspeople to mount a single production.

== Types of scenery ==
The construction of theatrical scenery will be frequently one of the most time-consuming tasks when preparing for a show. As a result, many theatres have a place for storing scenery (such as a loft) so that it can be used for multiple shows. Since future shows typically are not known far in advance, theatres will often construct stock scenery that can be easily adapted to fit a variety of shows. Common stock scenery types include:

- Curtains
- Flats
- Platforms
- Scenery wagons

== Gallery ==
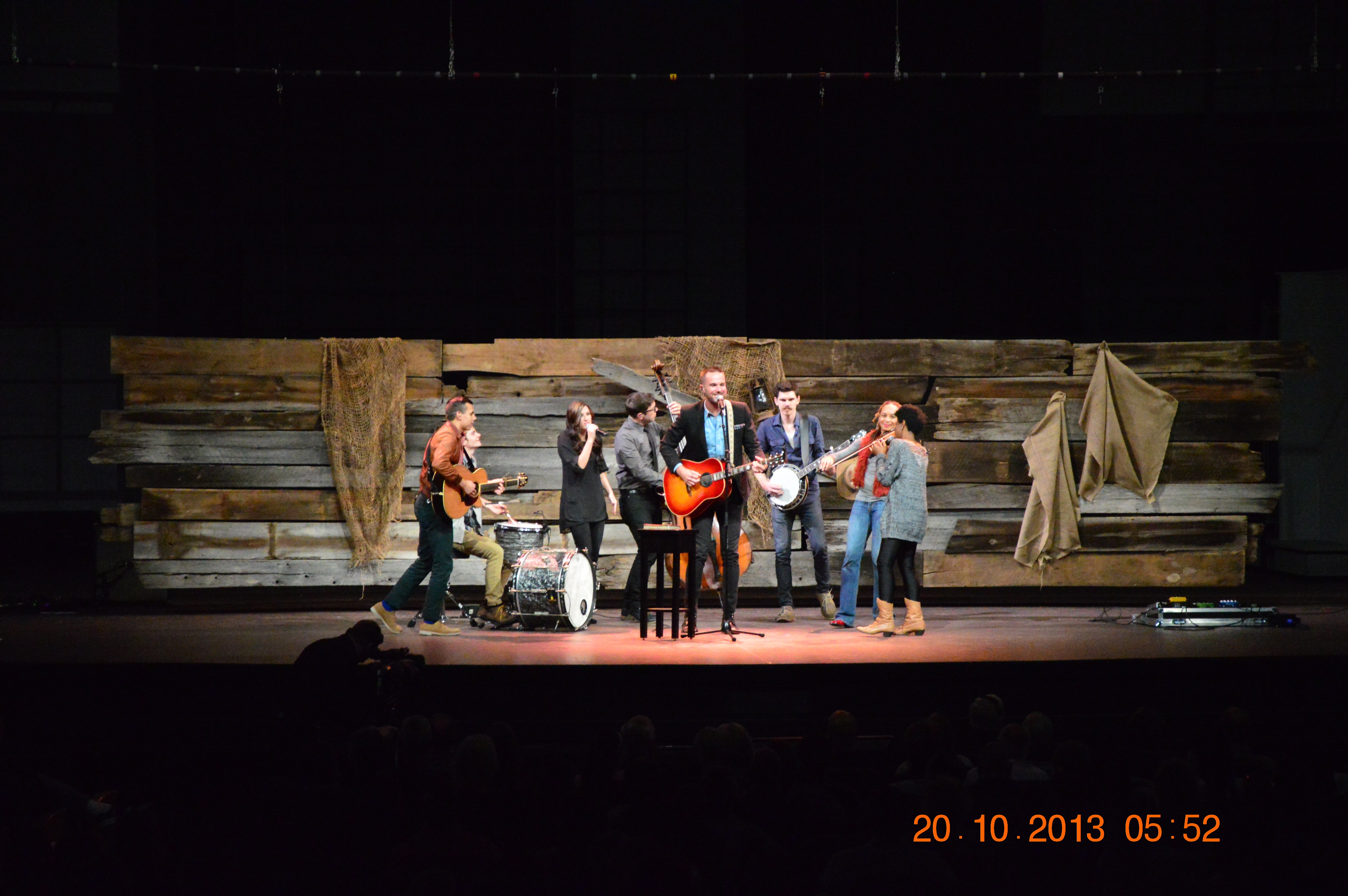
Scenic Barn Wall by Glenn Davis

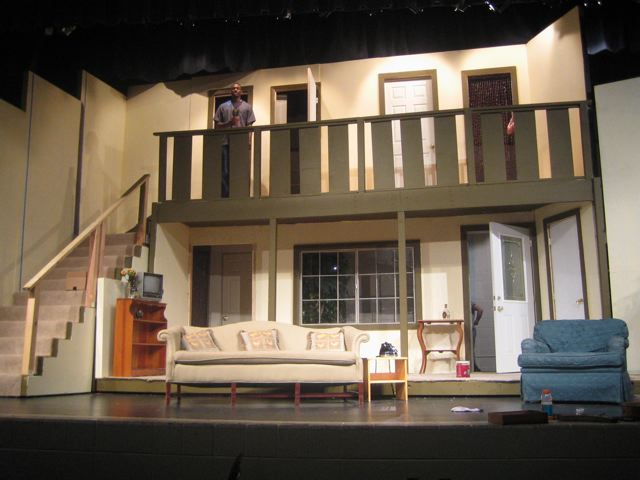
Modern-day rotating set for the play Noises Off

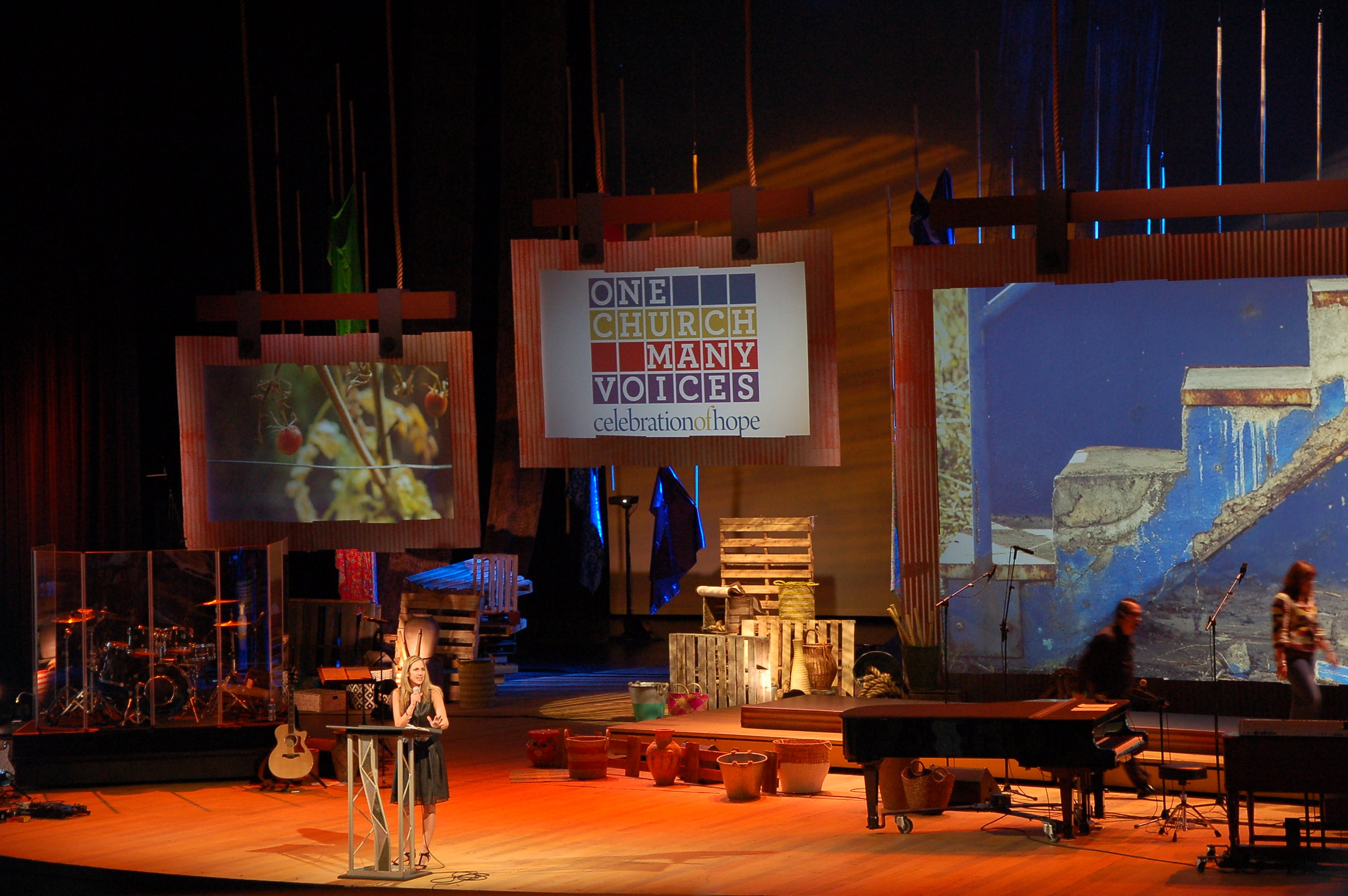
Video screens supporting a scenic design

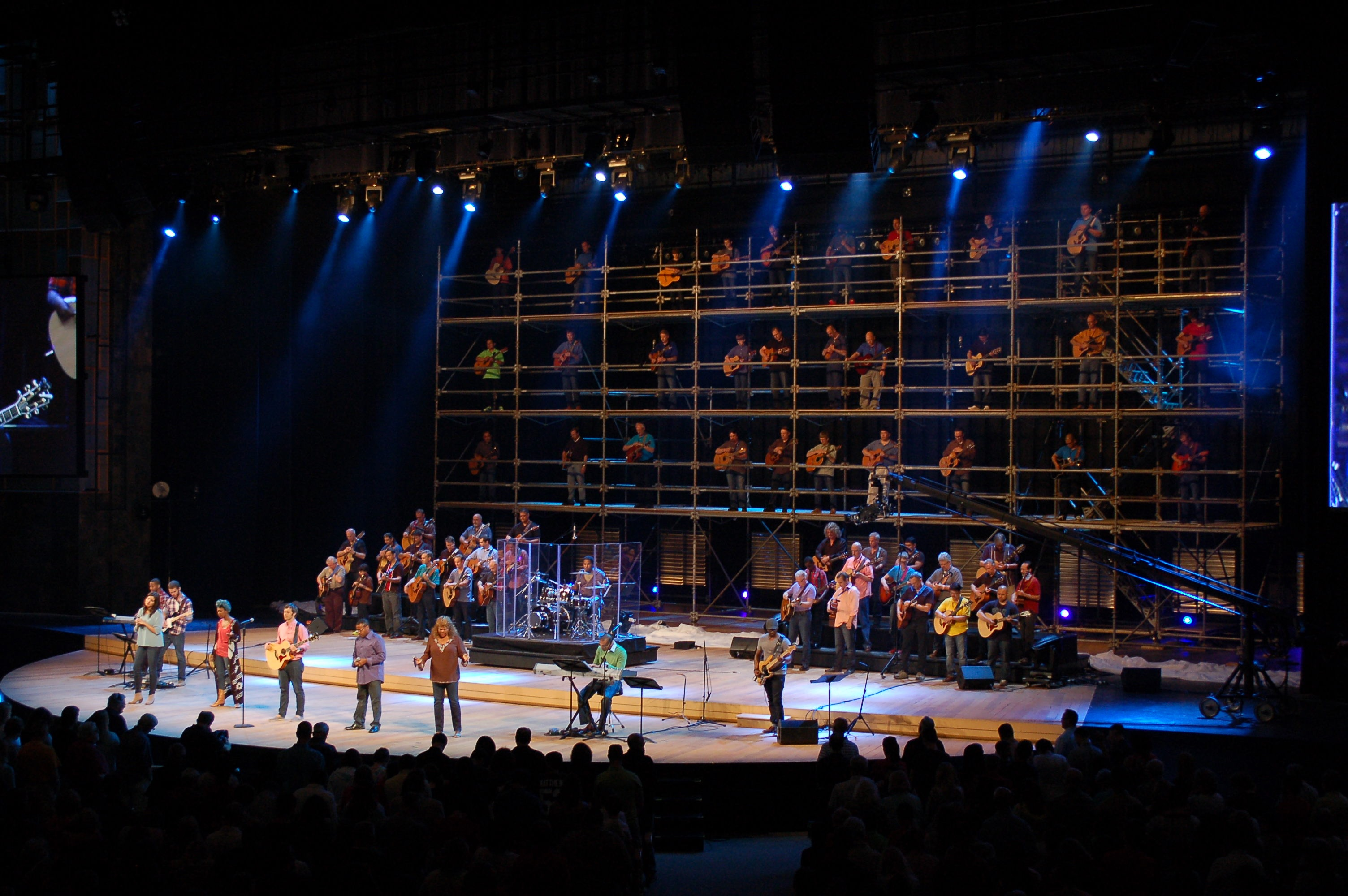
Scaffolding supporting a scenic design

== See also ==
- Set (film and TV scenery)
- Scenic design
- Set construction
- Scenography
