= Set dresser =

Worker who prepares a set with props and furniture

A set dresser in drama (theater, film etc.) prepares the set with props and furniture to give it correct appearance and make sure each item is in correct position for each performance.

== In film ==
Set dressers arrange objects on a film set before rolling the camera. They work under the direction of the Set Decorator, typically with a Leadman/Lead Person as their immediate supervisor. Set dressers place furniture, hang pictures, and put out decorative items. They are also responsible for some light construction and assembly of small items, such as air-conditioning ducts and light switch plates. They also move items as necessary to make room for the filming equipment. During the shoot, the prop department works with an on-set dresser to ensure that the props and furnishing are in the proper location for the script and to maintain continuity, as scenes are often shot out of order.

== In theater ==
Set dressers "dress" the set of a play. Set dressers specifically deal with items on stage that are not interacted with by actors. Often set dressers are in charge of finding and installing curtains, wallpaper, photos, bedspreads, rugs and other items onto the set. Set dressers are sometimes a part of the props department, construction department or their own department. Whether set dressing is its own department is often dependent on how much money a theater has. Set dressers also often have much cross-over work with the props department or construction department. The set dressing department works under the director, producer and scenic designer.

== See also ==
- Art director
- Property master
