= Scenic design =

Creation of theatrical or film scenery

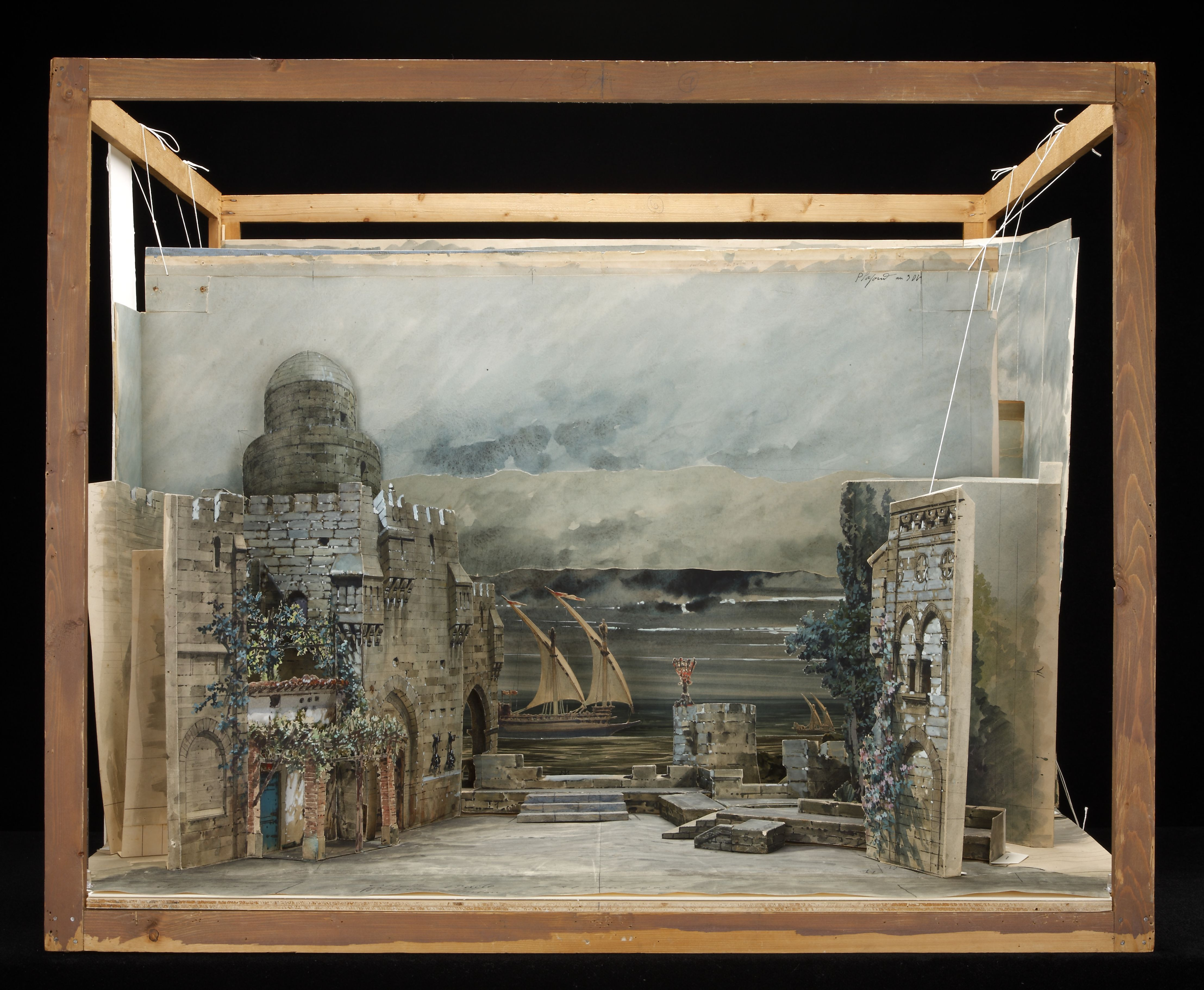
Set design model by Marcel Jambon for an 1895 Paris production of Giuseppe Verdi's Otello.

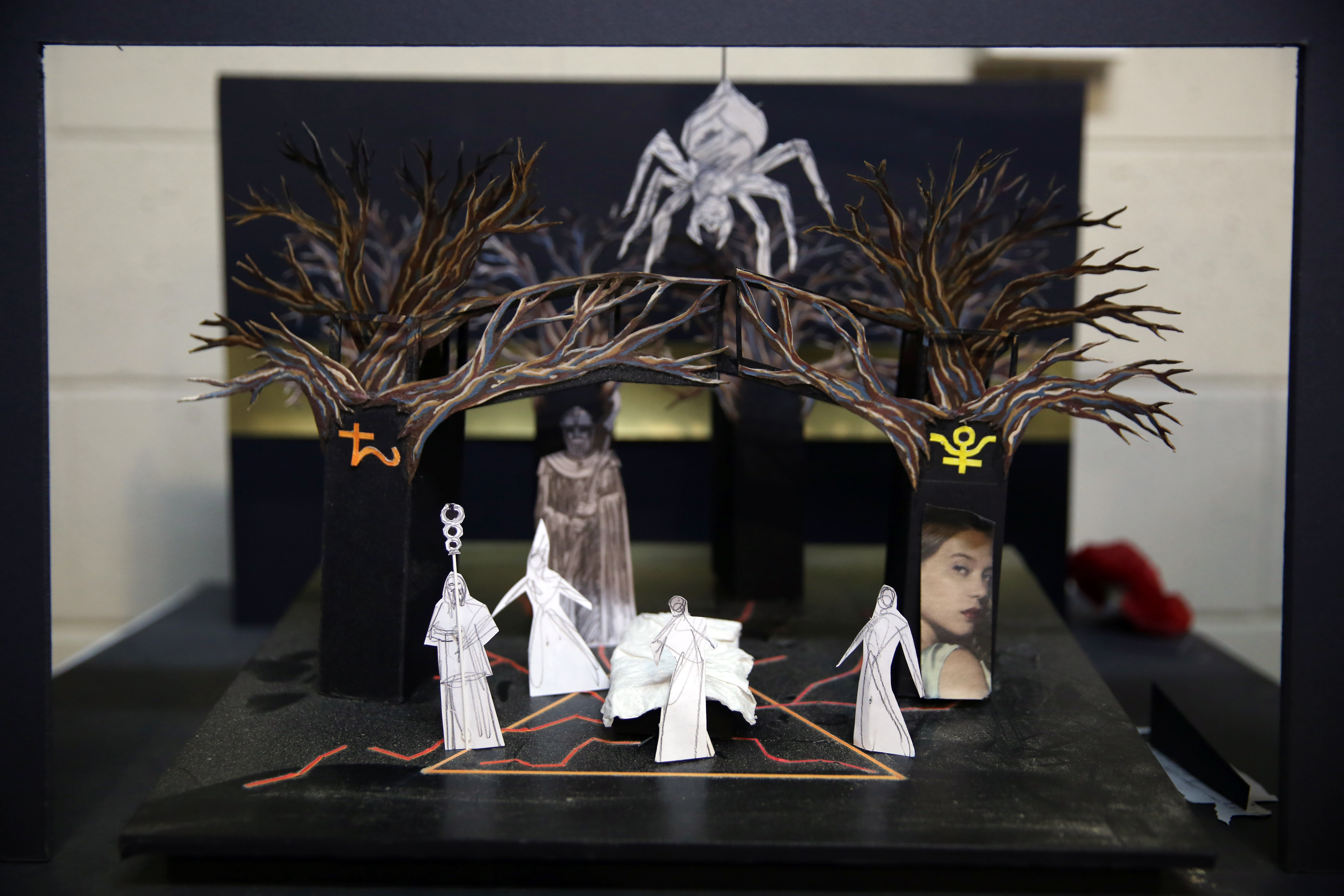
Set design for the New Zealand Opera's 2016 production of Mozart's Magic Flute

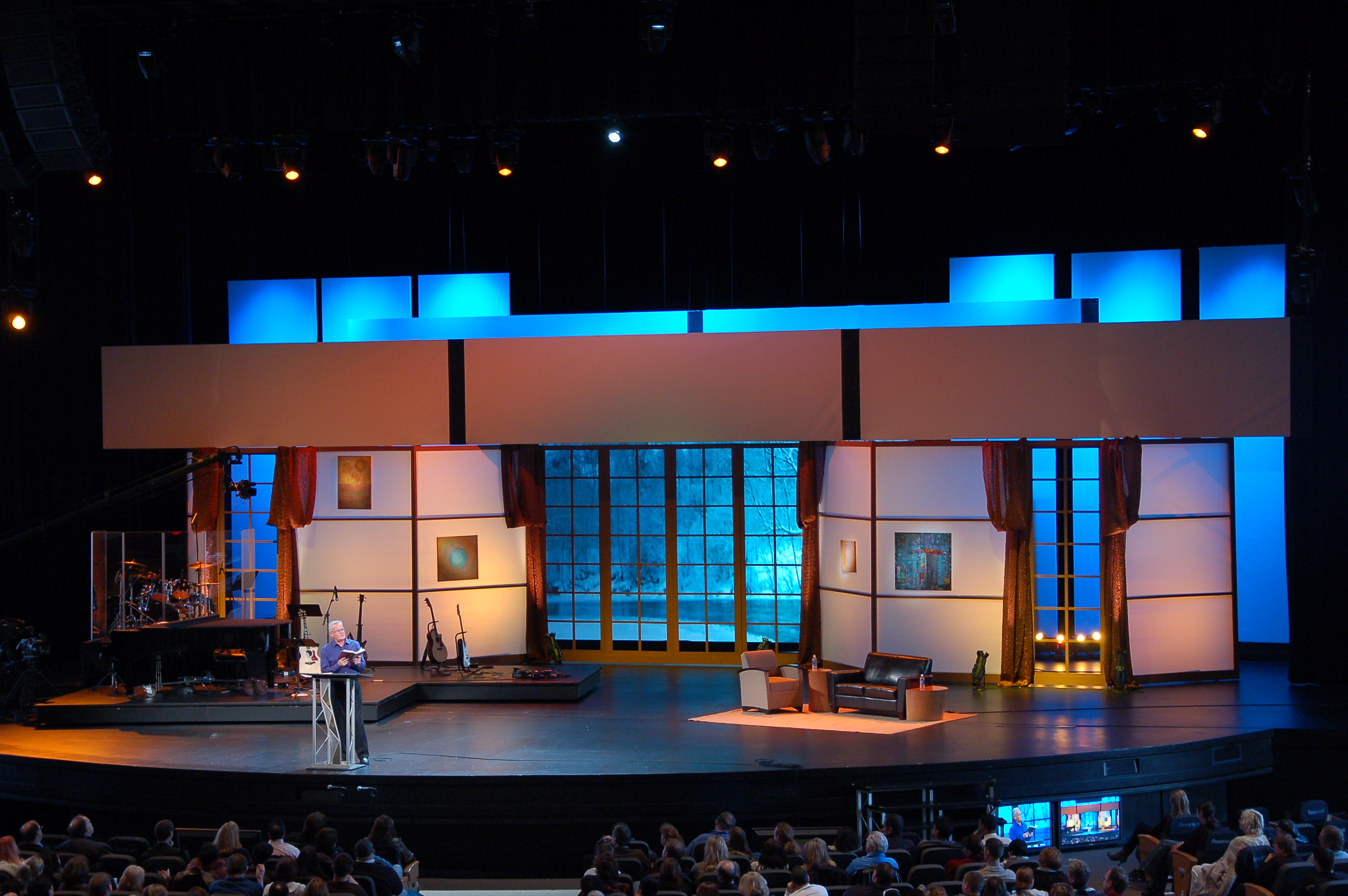
Scenic design for The 2010 Family Series, by Glenn Davis

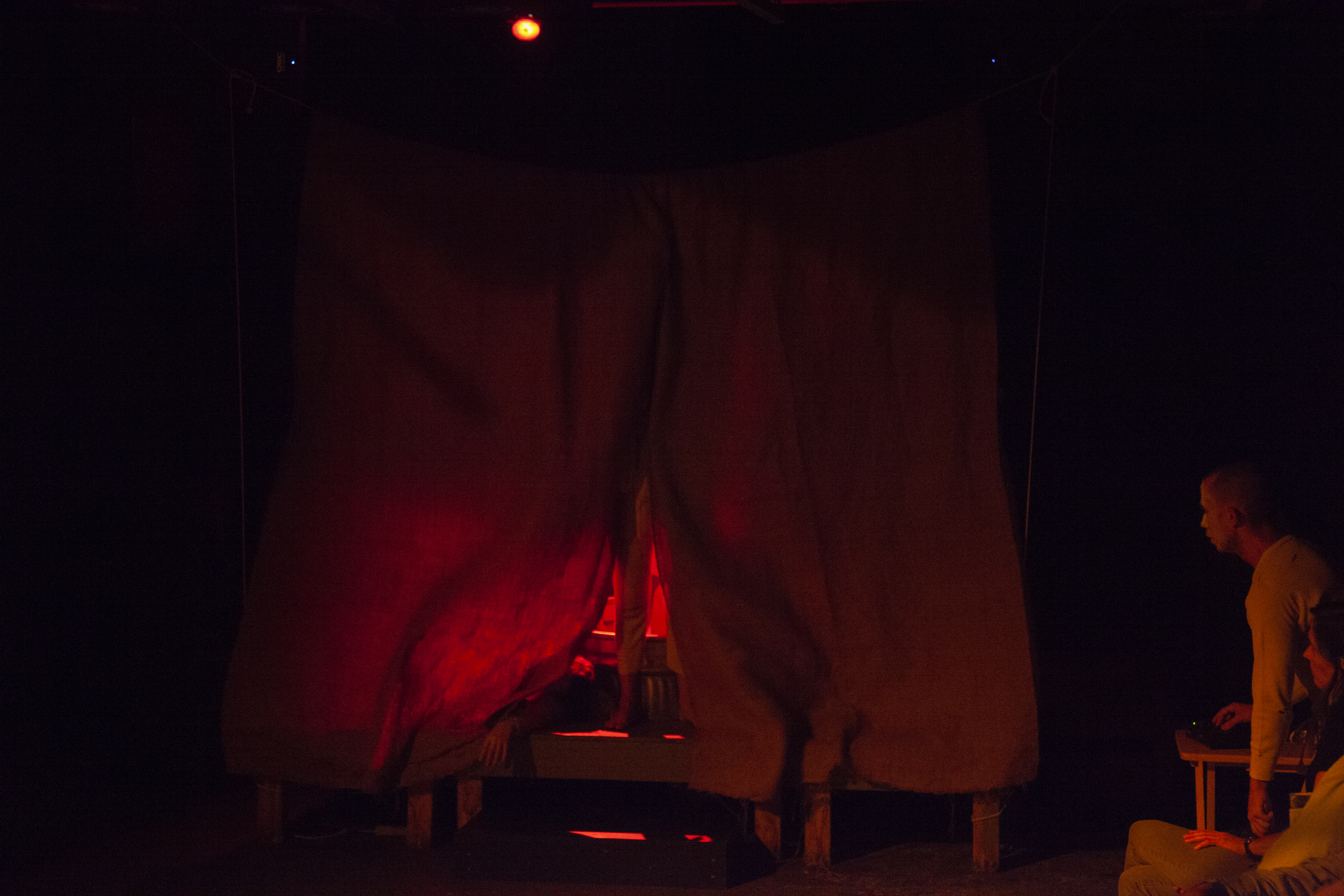
A simple red curtain set design for the Oresteia presented by Stairwell Theater, 2019

Scenic design, also known as stage design or set design, is the creation of scenery for theatrical productions including plays and musicals. The term can also be applied to film and television productions, where it may be referred to as production design. Scenic designers create sets and scenery to support the overall artistic goals of the production. Scenic design is an aspect of scenography, which includes theatrical set design as well as light and sound.

Modern scenic designers are increasingly taking on the role of co-creators in the artistic process, shaping not only the physical space of a production but also influencing its blocking, pacing, and tone. As Richard Foreman famously stated, scenic design is a way to "create the world through which you perceive things happening." These designers work closely with the director, playwright, and other creative members of the team to develop a visual concept that complements the narrative and emotional tone of the production. Notable scenic designers who have embraced this collaborative role include Robin Wagner, Eugene Lee, and Jim Clayburgh

== History ==
The origins of scenic design may be found in the outdoor amphitheaters of ancient Greece, when acts were staged using basic props and scenery. Because of improvements in stage equipment and drawing perspectives throughout the Renaissance, more complex and realistic sets could be created for scenic design. Scenic design evolved in conjunction with technological and theatrical improvements over the 19th and 20th centuries.

=== The New Stagecraft Movement ===
In the early 20th century, American scenic design underwent a dramatic transformation with the introduction of the New Stagecraft. Drawing inspiration from European pioneers like Adolphe Appia and Edward Gordon Craig, American designers began moving away from the overly detailed naturalism of the 19th century. Instead, they embraced simplified realism, abstraction, mood-driven environments, and symbolic imagery. Leaders of this movement, including Robert Edmond Jones, Lee Simonson, and Norman Bel Geddes, laid the foundation for a more interpretive and artistic approach to stage design in the United States.

=== Poetic Realism and Its Legacy ===
Following the New Stagecraft, designers like Jo Mielziner and Boris Aronson helped define a style known as poetic realism. Characterized by soft lighting, romantic imagery, scrims, and fragmented sets, this style prioritized the emotional tone of a production over strict realism. These designers often collaborated closely with playwrights and directors, shaping the mood and meaning of American theater classics like the early works of Arthur Miller and Tennessee Williams.

=== Modern Trends in Scenic Design ===
A key element of modern trends is the integration of spectacle. This movement towards larger-than-life visuals, mechanized scenery, and intricate special effects has reshaped both Broadway productions and regional theater. Designers like David Mitchell, known for his work on kinetic sets, exemplify the push towards spectacle that mirrors the influence of cinema on stage design. This trend emphasizes the audience's sensory experience, focusing on visual impact and technical prowess rather than traditional storytelling techniques alone.

At the same time, many designers are exploring minimalism and abstraction, moving away from overly realistic representations to create symbolic and suggestive environments that focus on mood rather than realism. The evolving role of the designer as a collaborator with directors and playwrights has also reinforced these trends, as designers today have a more equal voice in shaping the vision and narrative of a production.

== Elements of scenic design ==
Scenic design involves several key elements:

Set pieces
These are physical structures, such as platforms, walls, and furniture, that define the spatial environment of the performance. Set pieces are carefully constructed to reflect the time period, location, and atmosphere of the story.
Props
Objects used by actors during a performance, which help to establish the setting and enhance the narrative. Props can range from everyday objects to fantastical items, and they are integral to the story, helping to reveal character traits, advance the plot, or symbolize themes.
Backdrops

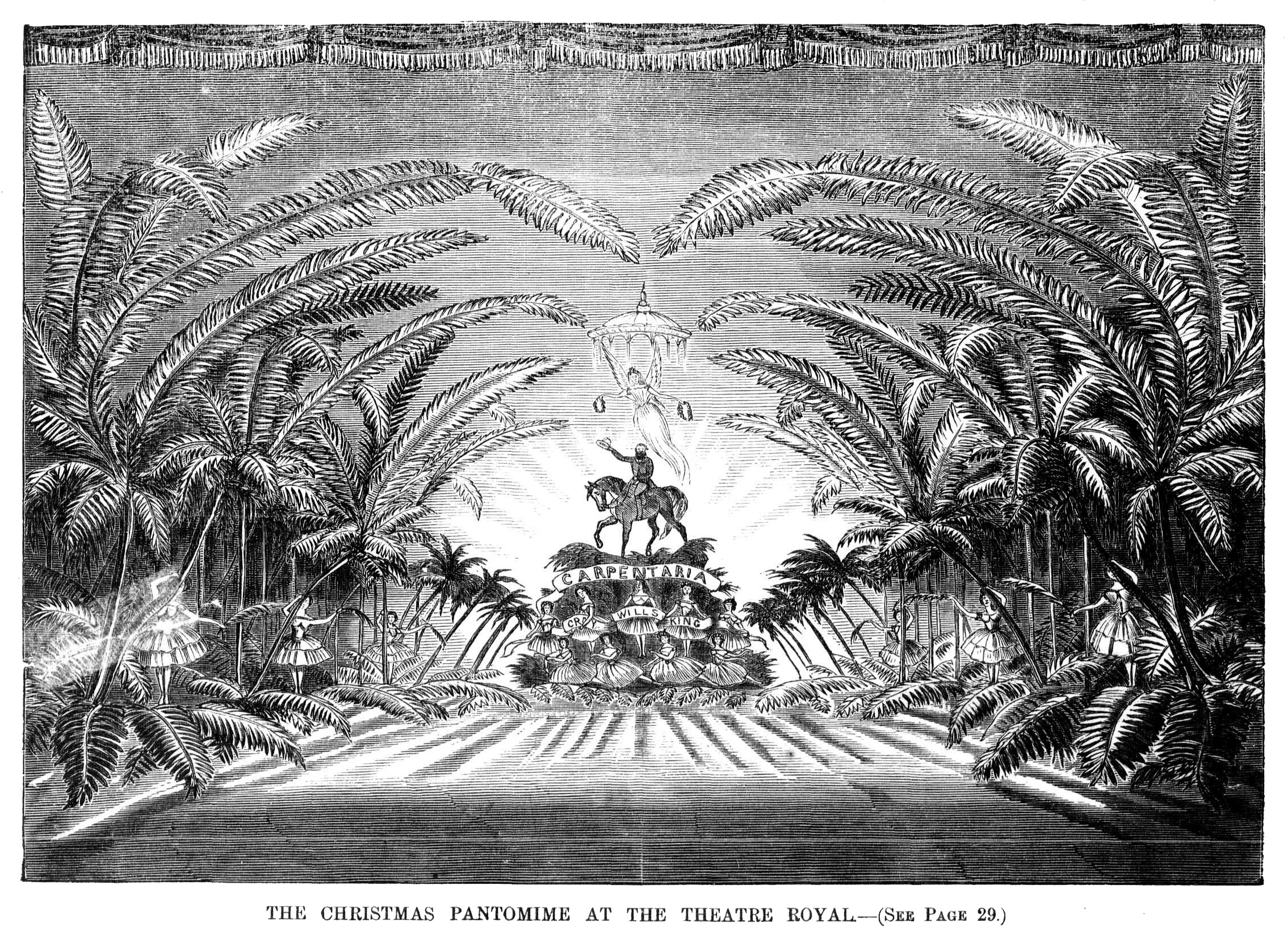
The Christmas Pantomime at the Theatre Royal', scenic backdrop by John Hennings, commemorating the tragic Burke and Wills expedition.

Painted or digitally projected backdrops and flat scenery that create the illusion of depth and perspective on stage. These elements help establish the overall mood of the scene and can be as detailed or abstract as the design requires. With advances in technology, projections and digital elements now allow for dynamic, evolving backdrops that enhance the visual storytelling.
Lighting
Setting the tone, ambiance, and focal point of the performance, lighting design is an essential component of scenic design. Advances in lighting technology have expanded the range of possibilities, enabling designers to control color, intensity, and movement.
Functionality
In order to meet the demands of the actors, crew, and technical specifications of the show, and sets must be useful and practical. When building the set, designers have to take accessibility, perspectives, entrances, and exits into account. Functionality ensures that the set can support the physical actions of the actors, accommodate scene changes, and maintain safety standards. Finding a balance between artistic design and practical design is a fundamental part of for overall design.
Scenic art and painting
Scenic artistry involves creating highly detailed, realistic paintings that enhance the visual storytelling of a production. Scenic artists paint backdrops, textures, and other elements that bring a designer's vision to life. They use a range of traditional and modern techniques, including trompe l'oeil (fooling the eye), texture application, and faux finishes to create realistic or abstract environments on stage. As digital and mechanized techniques have advanced, scenic artists now also incorporate technologies such as computer-generated imagery (CGI) and digital projection into their work.

== Scenic designer ==
A scenic designer works with the theatre director and other members of the creative team to establish a visual concept for the production and to design the stage environment. They are responsible for developing a complete set of design drawings that include:

- Basic floor plan showing all stationary scenic elements;
- Composite floor plan showing all moving scenic elements, indicating both their onstage and storage positions;
- Complete floor plan of the stage space incorporating all elements; and
- Front elevations of every scenic element and additional elevations of sections of units as required.

In planning, scenic designers often make multiple scale models and renderings. Models are often made before final drawings are completed for construction. These precise drawings help the scenic designer effectively communicate with other production staff, especially the technical director, production manager, charge scenic artist, and prop master.

In Europe and Australia, many scenic designers are also responsible for costume design, lighting design and sound design. They are commonly referred to as theatre designers, scenographers, or production designers.

Scenic design often involves skills such as carpentry, architecture, textual analysis, and budgeting. In addition, successful scenic designers must have a strong understanding of theatrical collaboration, including the ability to communicate ideas clearly, engage with the director's vision, and address technical challenges in the design.

Many modern scenic designers use 3D CAD models to produce design drawings that used to be done by hand. CAD tools have revolutionized the way designers create technical drawings, allowing for precise, scalable plans that are easier to adjust and communicate to the entire production team.

=== Influential Scenic designers ===
Some of the most influential scenic designers include:

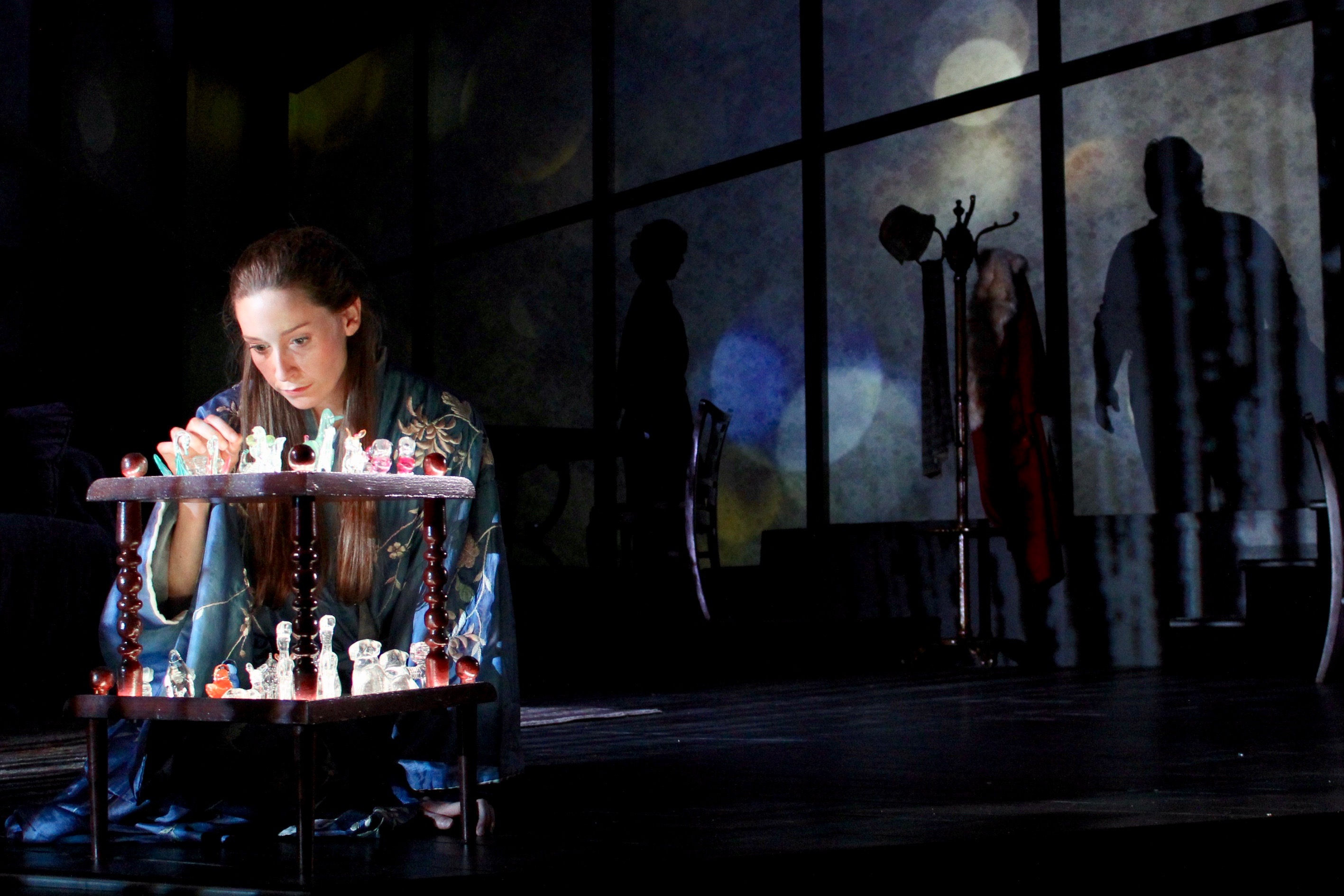
A scene from Tennessee Williams' The Glass Menagerie. The lighting and backdrop contribute to the play's atmosphere.

Robin Wagner: Known for his work on Broadway musicals like A Chorus Line and The Producers, Wagner's designs often blur the boundaries between traditional and modern aesthetics. His sets are celebrated for their dramatic flair and innovative use of space, enhancing both the storytelling and the audience's emotional engagement.

Eugene Lee: A key figure in contemporary scenic design, Lee's work on Sweeney Todd and The Glass Menagerie showcases his ability to create immersive environments that serve as a vital part of the narrative. His work often integrates lighting design with set elements to create an emotional connection with the audience.

Jim Clayburgh: Clayburgh's sets for productions like The Red Shoes and Pippin have demonstrated his collaborative process with directors and designers, focusing on creating highly theatrical and dynamic spaces that support the narrative's emotional core.

Bob Crowley: Recognized for his work on the Broadway musical The Lion King, Crowley's designs are iconic for their ability to integrate traditional African aesthetics with a modern theatrical approach. His work has influenced the integration of puppetry and stagecraft, making the set an active part of the storytelling process.

== Cultural Differences in Scenic Design ==
Scenic design varies significantly across different cultures, reflecting diverse traditions, artistic sensibilities, and historical contexts. These differences are particularly evident when comparing European, American, and Australian scenic design practices, as well as in non-Western theater traditions.

Designers in countries like Germany and France are typically referred to as scenographers, a term that emphasizes their role in integrating set design, lighting, and costume design into a cohesive artistic vision. This approach to design is especially well known in European operas. American scenic design traditionally focuses more on set construction and the physical environment of a production. Designers are often responsible for creating the illusion of realism, particularly in Broadway musicals and dramatic plays.

In Australia, scenic designers frequently take on multi-disciplinary roles. Many Australian designers, especially in regional theater, are involved in the design of both the sets and costumes, and they often collaborate closely with lighting and sound designers from the early stages of production.

In non-Western theater traditions, such as Chinese, Indian, and Japanese theater, often employ vastly different scenic approaches, relying heavily on symbolic elements, minimalistic sets, and dynamic stage movements. For example, Kabuki theater in Japan uses elaborate costumes and stylized, symbolic sets to convey meaning, with a heavy focus on color symbolism and abstract designs rather than realistic representations. In Chinese opera, the use of large, symbolic backdrops and the minimalistic set serves to enhance the performance of actors and emphasize the gestural language and music.

== Notable scenic designers ==
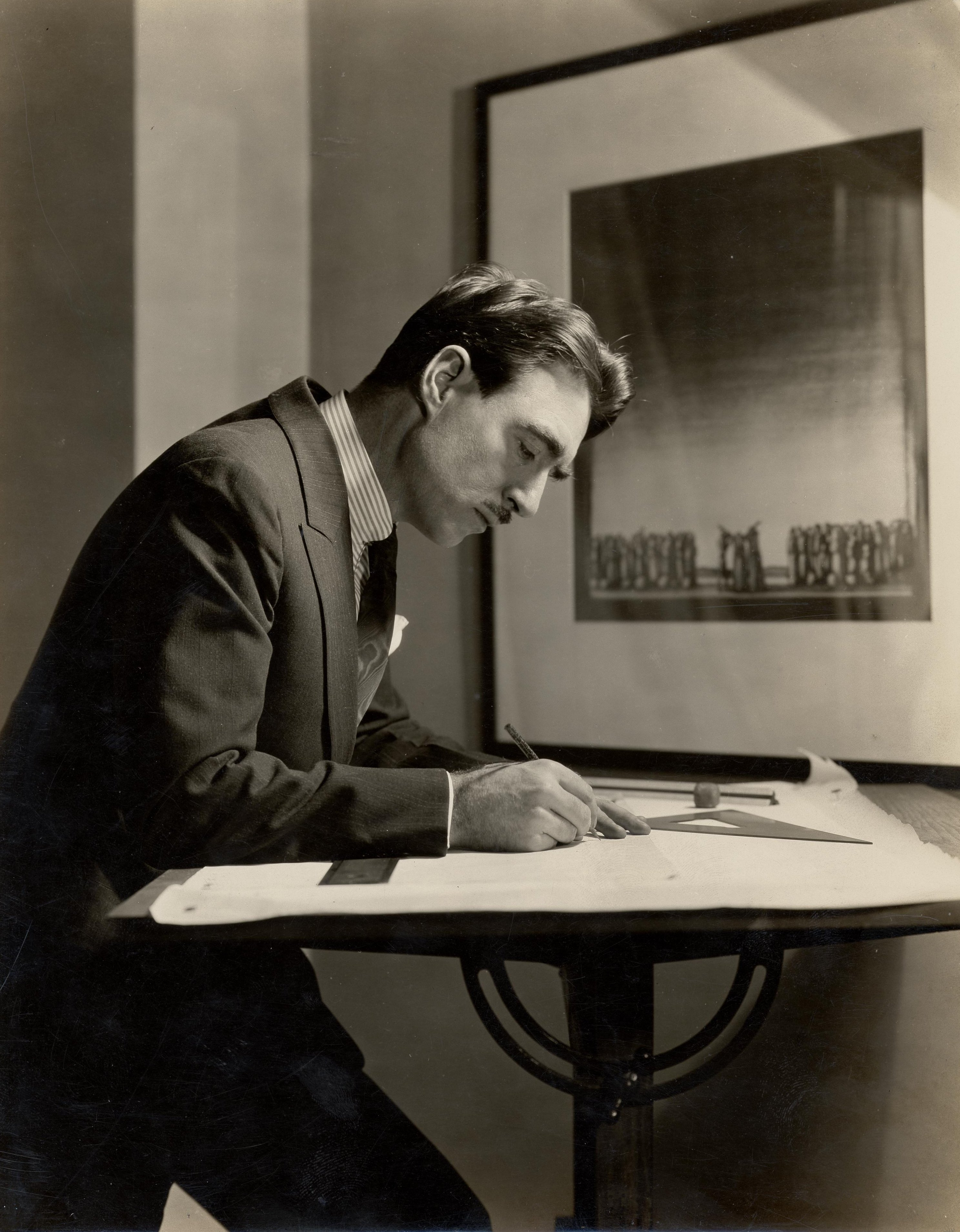
Scenic designer Robert Edmond Jones (1887–1954) drawing at a waist-high table (c. 1920).

Notable scenic designers include:

- Ken Adam
- Nathan Altman
- Adolphe Appia
- Boris Aronson
- Léon Bakst
- Howard Bay
- John Lee Beatty
- Brian Sidney Bembridge
- Alexandre Benois
- Maria Björnson
- Marc Chagall
- Alison Chitty
- Jim Clayburgh
- Anna Louizos
- John Conklin
- Edward Gordon Craig
- Bob Crowley
- Louis Daguerre
- Luciano Damiani
- Cyro Del Nero
- Es Devlin
- Aleksandra Ekster
- Ezio Frigerio
- David Gallo
- Nicholas Georgiadis
- Christopher Gibbs
- Natalia Goncharova
- Richard Hudson
- Inigo Jones
- Barry Kay
- Sean Kenny
- Roger Kirk
- Ralph Koltai
- Ming Cho Lee
- Eugene Lee
- Philip James de Loutherbourg
- Santo Loquasto
- Emanuele Luzzati
- Antony McDonald
- Jo Mielziner
- Caspar Neher
- Neil Patel
- Russell Patterson
- Jean-Pierre Ponnelle
- Todd Rosenthal
- Oliver Smith
- Josef Svoboda
- George Tsypin
- Robin Wagner
- Tony Walton
- Robert Wilson
- Franco Zeffirelli
- Eduardo Sicangco

== See also ==
- Prop design
- Film sculptor
- Scenic painting
- Scenographer
- Scenography
- Set construction
- Stage machinery
- Theatrical scenery
