= Sophocles (software) =

Software for writing screenplays

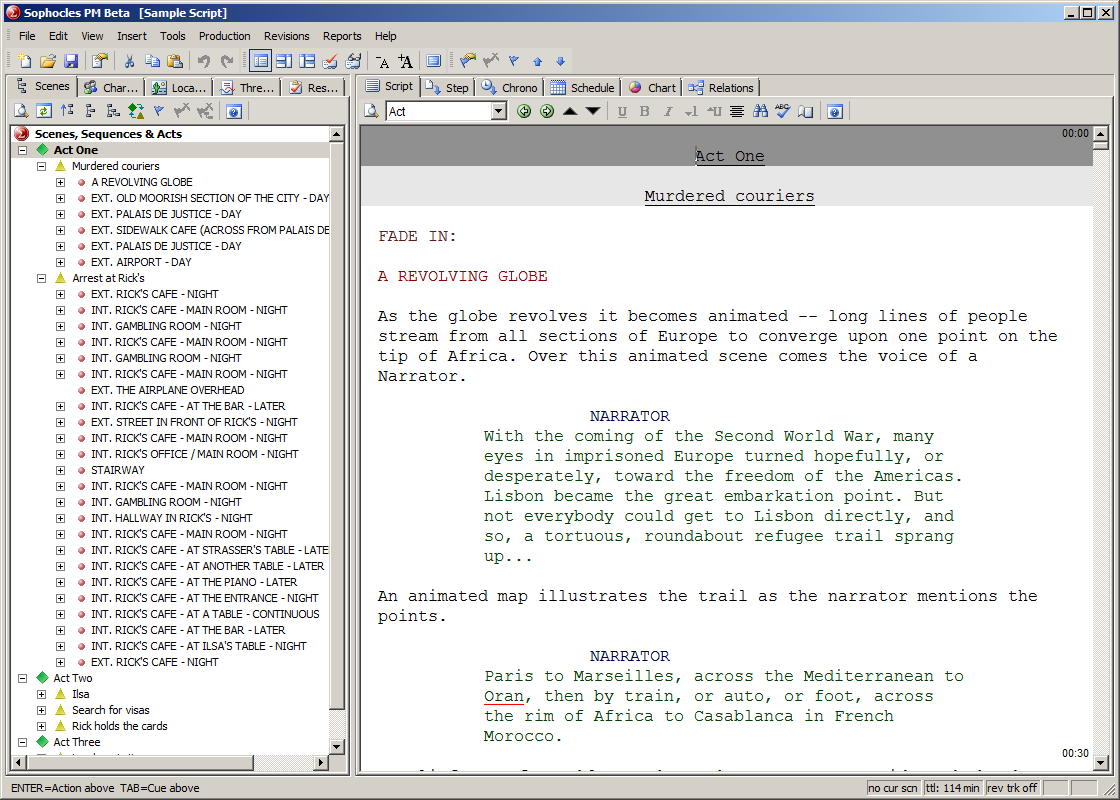
- Scene detail, location explorer, and script view.
- Developer(s): Sophocles Software, LLC
- Stable release: 2007 (Beta) / February 2007
- Operating system: Windows
- Type: Screenplay and production management for motion pictures
- License: Proprietary

Sophocles was a Windows-based screenwriting software application used for writing feature film and television screenplays. The program first became available on the Internet in 1999. Its distinguishing features included a two window screen setup, showing the script and screenplay outline simultaneously.

Sophocles supported industry-standard screenplay formats including scene numbers, A/B revision pages, revision marks, MOREs and CONT'Ds, and so on. All formats were applied automatically, with no intervention required on the part of the user.

After the buyout of the company in Spring 2008, first party technical support disappeared, creating concern among its users.

== Features ==
=== Story creation ===
The Sophocles 2007 beta provides an interface for developing and maintaining a step outline in conjunction with the screenplay. Steps – the fundamental events of a plot – can be assigned to color-coded story threads, and scripts can contain multiple threads.

Steps are maintained in two distinct orderings: presentation order and chronological order. Presentation order (or script order) is the order in which the steps will unfold on-screen; chronological order is the order in which the steps take place in the world of the story (the two would differ in the case of a flashback, for example).

Steps can be flagged as implemented after they’ve been written into the script, or off-screen to indicate they won’t be implemented at all.

The program generates read-only story visualization and analysis diagrams, including a variety of histograms and a social graph. Descriptive information can be provided for individual acts, sequences, characters, and so forth.

=== Scheduling ===
Sophocles' scheduling interface mimics the standard production board used by the motion picture industry. Production strips display summary information for every scene; a schedule is prepared by dragging the strips into shooting order and inserting dividers to mark the ends of days. Multiple alternative schedules can be stored for later recall. Multiple production units are supported, with a separate schedule for each unit.

Other schedule-related features include:

- Automatically generated Day Out of Days with optimized drop/hold periods.
- Automatically generated call sheets and sides.
- The schedule can be printed in standard or one-line format, or on paper strips for use in an actual production board.
- An advanced auto-scheduler employs sophisticated AI techniques to account for resource availability constraints, day versus night scenes, interiors versus exteriors, and so on.
- Real-time synchronization with the word-processing and budgeting modules.

=== Budgeting ===
Presentation-quality budgets.

Sophocles 2007 includes a full-featured budgeting module integrated with the word-processing and scheduling modules. Custom designed budget tables or entire charts of accounts can be saved, along with default cost entries, to template files for use across multiple projects. Preparation of individual tables can be delegated to department heads or other experts.

Each production unit has its own budget which can be viewed and printed independently or as a component of the overall budget. Budgets can be exported to PDF or to Microsoft Excel format (XLS). Exporting to Excel preserves all user defined fringes, formulas, and references in the resulting spreadsheet.

Other budgeting features include:

- Four levels of detail (top-sheet, table, account, and account detail).
- Automatic calculation of schedule-dependent resource costs.
- Automatic generation of detail tables for each resource category (props, vehicles, cast members, etc.).
- Segregation of locations by zone (studio, location, or remote location) and cast members by type (principal, supporting, or day).
- User defined currency symbol and exchange rate multiplier.

=== Reporting ===
Sophocles generates a variety of production related reports and forms, including call sheets, actor's sides, day out of days, and so on. Call sheets are populated automatically by referring to the schedule for a list of resources scheduled on a given day. Sides are generated in a similar way, by printing all the script pages scheduled to be shot on a given day for a given part.

Other reports include:

- Breakdown sheets
- Resource lists, breakdowns, and continuity reports
- Scene and sequence cards
- Story threads and steps
- Script notes

== Editions ==
Beta testing for Sophocles 2007 hoped to incorporate scheduling, budgeting and reporting components, and extend the program’s existing story-planning capabilities. The components were to be fully integrated, remaining synchronized as edits are made. For example, when the schedule was modified, the budget simultaneously displayed new values to reflect the change. The final release of Sophocles 2007 was to be made available in three editions:

- Sophocles Basic included the core word-processing and formatting engines.
- Sophocles Pro included the extended story-creation features.
- Sophocles PM included the budgeting, scheduling, and reporting modules.

== Possible company buyout ==
There has been speculation that on March 21, 2008, Sophocles was purchased by a third party. By late April, 2008, its website was shut down and Tim Sheehan, the software's creator, could not be reached for comment.

== See also ==
General

- List of screenwriting software
- List of project management software

Related

- Filmmaking
- Screenwriting
- Pre-production
