= Principal photography =

Phase of producing a film or television show in which the bulk of shooting takes place

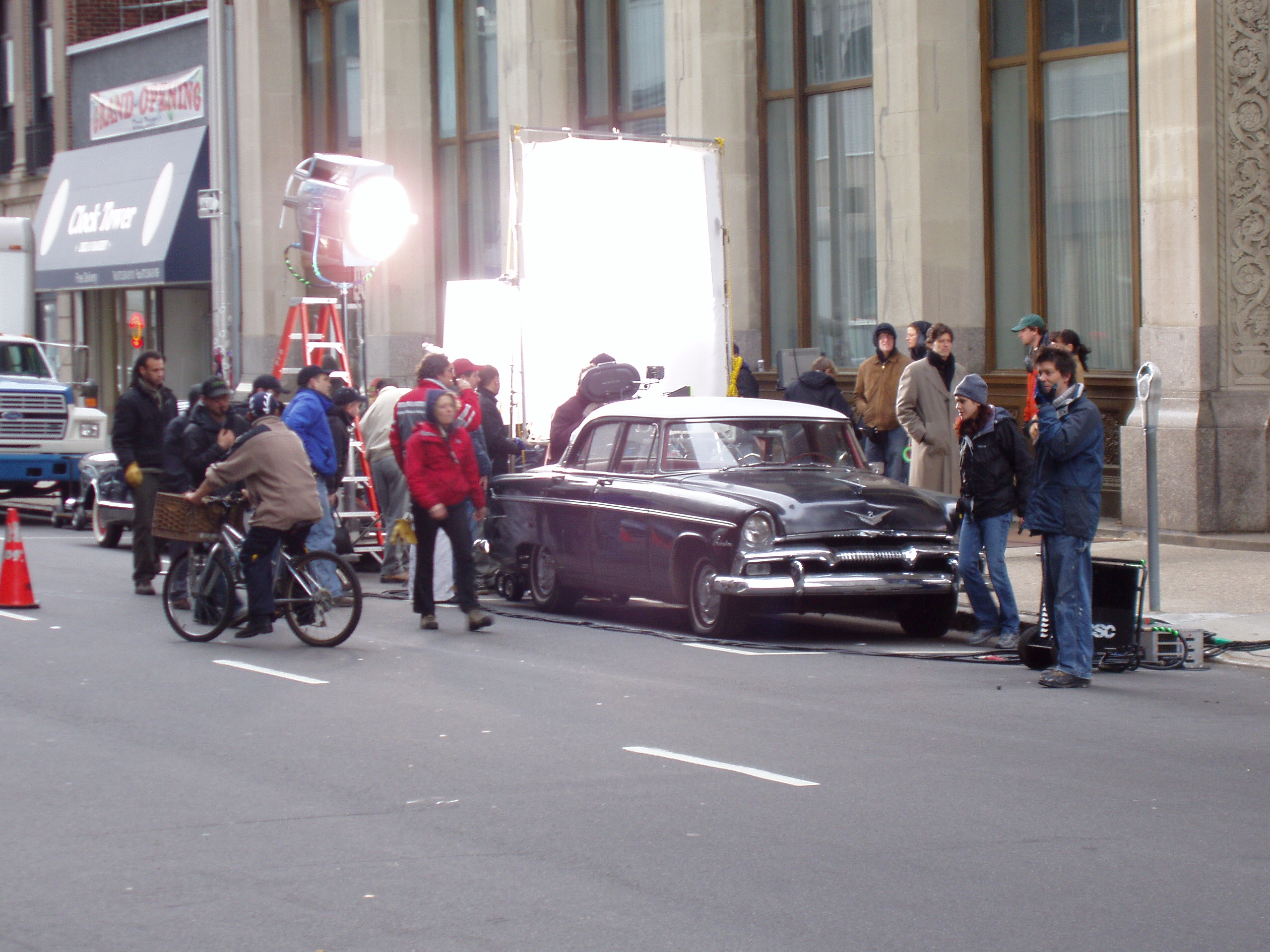
MTV movie production takes place on location in Newark, New Jersey.

Principal photography is the phase of producing a film or television show in which the bulk of shooting takes place, as distinct from the phases of pre-production and post-production.

== Personnel ==
Besides the main film personnel, such as the actors, director, cinematographer(s) or sound engineer(s) and their respective assistants (assistant director, camera assistant, boom operator), the unit production manager plays a decisive role in principal photography. They are responsible for the daily implementation of the shoot, managing the daily call sheet, the location barriers, transportation, and catering. Additional typical roles during filming include the script supervisor to record changes to the script and the still photographer to produce images for advertising and documentation.

Several reports are prepared each day to track the progress of a film production, including the daily production report, the daily progress report, and the sound report.

== Process ==
=== Preparation ===
Principal photography can take place in a studio or in an actual setting, and the choice of location depends on artistic and economic aspects. While shooting in a sound stage offers more accurate planning, constructing sets may be expensive. Costs and artistic reasons (see French New Wave and Dogme 95) are the main drives behind filming on location. However, outdoor shooting requires more effort because equipment and personnel must be transported to the location. In the early days of cinema, filmmakers tried to film outdoors as much as possible, as sunlight was needed to ensure adequate exposure of poor-quality early film stock; nowadays, due to the increased use of CGI, more shooting is done in a studio.

Depending on the laws of the respective country, the producer must obtain filming permits from private individuals, authorities or companies for the selected locations before filming begins. An extensive production may require closing the area with signs and diversions. A filming permit within an urban area usually requires a fee, which depends on the complexity and scope of the filming as well as the attractiveness of the location.

Once the locations have been set, the screenplay is summarized in a script breakdown with all information relevant to the shooting. Under the supervision of the producer, the unit production manager prepares the production schedule, production board, and shooting schedule to work out the exact sequence in which the scenes in the script will be shot. Due to a great many considerations beyond the scope of this article (but addressed at length in the production board article), the sequence of the scenes to be shot normally does not follow their chronological sequence in the script. These schedules are then used to build the daily call sheets, which summarize the relevant information from the schedule and lists exactly who has to be on the set for a planned daily shoot. At the same time, the call sheets provides information about the scene numbers, script pages and locations relevant for each day, as well as the necessary equipment.

Feature films usually have insurance in place by the time principal photography begins. The death of a bankable star before completing all planned takes or the loss of sets or footage can render a film impossible to complete as planned. Furthermore, professional quality movie cameras are usually rented as needed, and most camera houses do not allow rentals of their equipment without proof of insurance.

All this meticulous planning is necessary because time equals money. Every hour spent on set resolving issues which could have been resolved earlier—while the cast and crew wait for filming to resume—equals thousands of dollars which will need to come out of some other portion of the film's budget. As of 2012, the average "day cost" for an American film ranged from as low as $25,000 for low-budget films, to $35,000-$60,000 for midlevel budget films, to as high as $100,000-$250,000 for blockbuster films. The first assistant director is paid very well to keep filming on schedule and within the original budget, and may be replaced (that is, fired) if the production strays too far from its original schedule and budget.

=== Main shooting ===
Principal photography is typically the most expensive phase of film production, due to actor, director, and set crew salaries, as well as the costs of certain shots, props, and on-set special effects. When filming begins, the preparation time is over: the final version of the script is done, the cast has been selected, and the buildings and structures on set have largely been completed. The start of filming generally marks a point of no return for the financiers, because until it is complete, there is unlikely to be enough material filmed to release a final product needed to recoup costs. While it is common for a film to lose its greenlight status during the pre-production phase – for example, when an essential cast member drops out or unexpectedly dies, or some scandal engulfs the studio or an actor – it is rare for a film to lose financing once principal photography has begun.

Immediately before a take is shot, the scene is rehearsed with camera, light and sound. Most American productions follow a specific procedure:

The assistant director (AD) calls "picture is up!" to inform everyone that a take is about to be recorded, and then "quiet, everyone!" Once everyone is ready to shoot, the AD calls "roll sound" (if the take involves sound), and the production sound mixer will start their equipment, record a verbal slate of the take's information, and announce "sound speed", or just "speed", when they are ready. The AD follows with "roll camera", answered by "speed!" by the camera operator once the camera is recording. The clapper, who is already in front of the camera with the clapperboard, calls "marker!" and slaps it shut. If the take involves extras or background action, the AD will cue them ("action background!"), and last is the director, telling the actors "action!". The AD may echo "action" louder on large sets.

A take is over when the director calls "Cut!" and the camera and sound stop recording. The ritual helps the general concentration at the location and allows saving costs by only recording the scene rather than the preparation for the scene. Each shot is repeated until the director is satisfied with it.

In addition to the actual film crew that does the principal photography (unit), there may be a second team (second unit), which in turn comprises a full film crew with its own director, especially for more complex productions. The second unit works independently but in coordination with the director of the overall project and is responsible for city and landscape shots, establishing shots and intermediate images as well as for mass, action and stunt scenes.

The length of the filming depends not only on the length of the film, but also on the number and type of locations. The shooting time for a 90-minute film in Europe is 12 to 100 days. In the US, depending on the film project, a shooting time of 15 to 20, 40 to 50 or, for larger productions, 80 to 100 days is used as a basis for studio productions, although in other countries the shooting takes considerably longer. Because of breaks in recording and subsequent shoots that are difficult to calculate, the principal photography is usually planned longer than actually necessary.

Once a film concludes principal photography, it is said to have wrapped, and a wrap party may be organized to celebrate. During post-production, it may become apparent that some shots or sequences are missing or incomplete and are required to complete the film, or that a particular scene is not playing as expected, or that a performer needs to be replaced entirely. In these circumstances, additional material may have to be shot.

=== Follow-ups ===
When using analog cameras, the exposed photographic film from a day of shooting is rushed to a photographic processing lab for development overnight, and then the developed raw footage is viewed by the director, cinematographer and producer the next day to determine whether reshooting is needed. With digital cameras, the so-called dailies can be viewed immediately after they are recorded. If the material proves to be inadequate or faulty, a re-shoot will be carried out on the day of shooting (digital) or on the day of the viewing (analog).

Sometimes, additional shooting is needed after principal photography is complete, because the shots already made have subsequently turned out to be unusable or additional shots are required. For example, serious deficiencies in the narrative structure may become clear only after filming (such as when a rough cut of the film is put through test screenings with audiences who have not had the benefit of reading the screenplay in advance). Other reasons for re-shoots may be the production company's desire to make the film more commercially appealing, or the replacement of actors whose performance was lacking or who no longer fit the project after significant revisions to the film's plot or tone.

If the new material has already been shot once or is substantial, this process is referred to as a re-shoot. However, if the material is new and relatively minor, it is often referred to as a pick-up.
