= Script breakdown =

Aspect of creating a performance

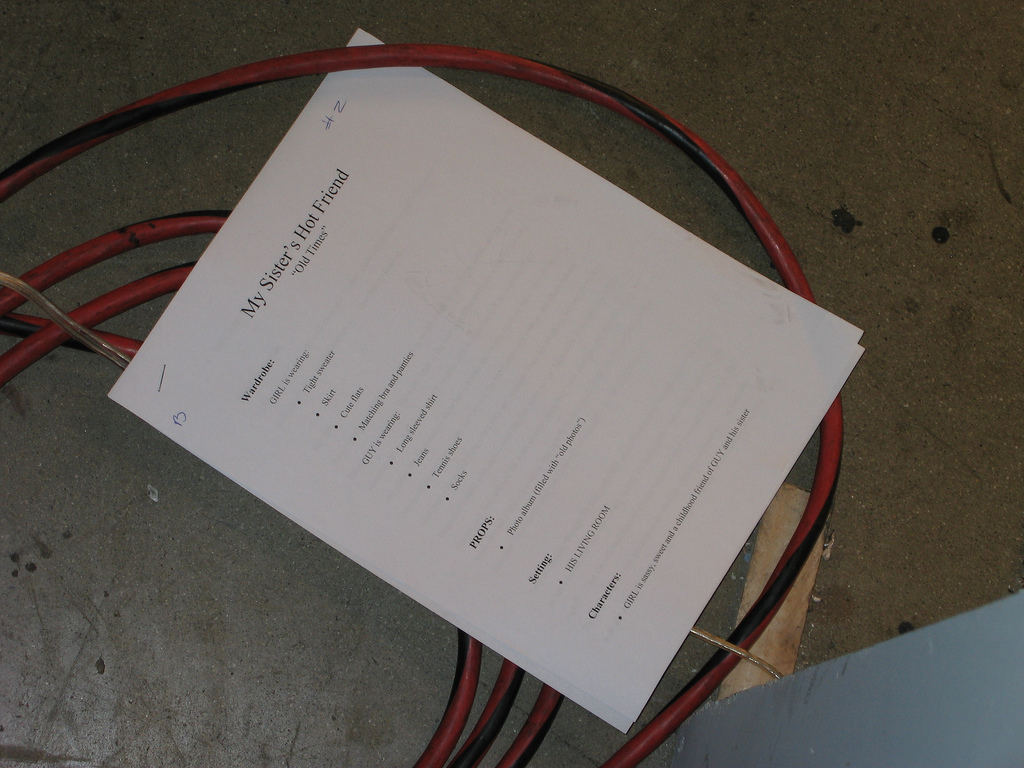
First page of a script for a pornographic film, showing set elements, costumes and a brief character breakdown

A script breakdown is an intermediate step in the production of a play, film, comic book, or any other work that is originally planned using a script.

== Film and television ==
In film and television, a script breakdown is an analysis of a screenplay in which all of the production elements are reduced into lists. Within these lists are, in essence, the foundation of creating a production board, which is fundamental in creating a production schedule and production budget of an entire production of any film or television program in pre-production. This process is a very tedious and complex task, and is usually the responsibility of the Assistant Director or first or 1AD within the production staff of any given production company. However, many film directors and film producers have knowledge of breaking down a script.

In filmmaking, a script breakdown is an analysis of dramatic action in which a screenplay is parsed into its narrative and operational components.

From a dramatic perspective, the breakdown examines elements such as reciprocal struggle, theme, and design elements of a screenplay. The process involves coding the entire cast, extras, props, special effects, stunts, wranglers, picture cars, wardrobe, make-up and hair stylists, special equipment and or cameras, ADR, Foley, film scores and soundtracks etc., which are broken-down with different colored marker highlights within a shooting script.

These highlights are then organized and broken-down into strips to organize the production schedule within the actual physical production board. This process is more easily done nowadays utilizing a computer than done manually, with features inside Final Draft called tagger, or utilizing tagging mode inside Movie Magic Screenwriter, another effective computer program. This information can easily be imported over to a scheduling program like Gorilla Scheduling, Movie Magic Scheduling or Yamdu to continue with shooting scheduling. Most of the script and production computer software out there comes in both Microsoft and MacOS versions, and even though there is competing software on the market, these which are listed are considered to be an entertainment industry standard. This whole process of the script breakdown however is not to be confused with character breakdowns utilized with casting calls, this is an entirely different process with similar names, however administered by two entirely separate departments.

=== Marking elements ===
To ease future production, an assistant director marks the elements found in each scene. This process repeats for each new scene. By the end, the producer will be able to see which scenes need which elements, and can begin to schedule accordingly. The film industry has a standard for color-coding:

Element color codes
Element	Shape or color		Description
Cast		Red	Any speaking actor
Stunts		Orange	Any stunt that may require a stunt double, or stunt coordinator.
Extra (silent)		Yellow	Any extra needed to perform specifically, but has no lines.
Extra (atmosphere)		Green	Any extra or group of extras needed for the background.
Special effects		Blue	Any special effect required.
Props		Purple	All objects important to the script, or used by an actor.
Vehicles and animals		Pink	Any vehicles, and all animals, especially if it requires an animal trainer.
Sound effects or music		Brown	Sounds or music requiring specific use on set. Not sounds added in during post.
Wardrobe	⭘	Circle	Specific costumes needed for production, and also for continuity if a costume gets ripped up, or dirtied throughout the production.
Make-up and hair	⁎	Asterisk	Any make-up or hair attention needed. Common for scars and blood.
Special equipment	◻	Box	If a scene requires the use of more uncommon equipment, (e.g. crane, underwater camera).
Production notes	_	Underline	For all other questions about how a scene will go, or confusion about how something happens.

== Comics ==
In comic books, it is the process of determining how each action, character, and piece of dialogue described in the script will be placed visually on a page. In the studio system that dominated mass-market comic-book production from the 1940s through the 1970s, breakdowns were done by the penciller or by a separate breakdown artist, rarely by the scriptwriter; in some cases, breakdowns were done from a rough story outline before the dialogue was written (the "Marvel method"). Later comics writers such as Alan Moore and Neil Gaiman, influenced by cinematic technique, began to include more layout details within their scripts. Cartoonists who both write and draw their own work sometimes begin with a script and do their own breakdowns, and sometimes work through drawings without a separate script.

== See also ==
- Storyboard
