= Scripped =

Online screenplay services company

- Scripped Writer
- Developers: Scripped, Inc. (later Scripted, Inc.)
- Initial release: 8 January 2008; 17 years ago
- Operating system: Any (Web-based application)
- Website: http://www.scripped.com

Scripped was an online screenplay services company offering three services: script writing, script registration, and script coverage. Scripped did not facilitate collaboration among screenwriters. It combined with Zhura in 2010. According to Techcrunch, Scripped had more than 60,000 writers as of March 2010.

Scripped was administered by Sunil Rajaraman, Ryan Buckley and Zak Freer. Actor, writer, and director Edward Burns and screenwriter Steven E. de Souza joined Scripped's Board of Advisers in May 2008. In 2008, the company formed a partnership with Write Brothers, makers of Movie Magic Screenwriter software. On March 29, 2010, Scripped announced that it closed $250,000 in private investment and merged with competitor Zhura. Scripped's CEO, Sunil Rajaraman, remains the merged company's Chief Executive Officer.

On April 1, 2015, citing a serious technical failure, Scripped shuttered its service. As part of the announcement, it was disclosed that their backup servers had failed as well, losing all of its users' stored scripts.

The website URL currently redirects to WriterDuet's website, another online scriptwriting service; Scripped had advertised WriterDuet in Scripped's shutdown open letter.

== Features ==
The Scripped Writer provided a built-in screenplay template which formatted the document to a standard for scripts as recommended by the AMPAS. The screenplay document was composed of seven elements: scene, action, character, dialog, parenthetical, transition and general. Each element had a specific style to which the Scripped Writer conformed as text was entered.

Like other client-side screenplay software, Scripped offered Tab-Enter toggling between screenplay elements, making the writing process much faster.

Text files could be imported into the Scripped Writer and automatically conformed to the screenplay template. Completed scripts could be exported as PDF files.

In May 2011 the administrators of Scripped launched Scripted.com - a sister site focused on freelance writing jobs. Subsequent to the service's launch, the company was renamed to Scripted, Inc.

== See also ==
- Web 2.0
- Screenwriting
- Screenwriting software
- List of screenwriting software
