= One liner schedule =

Condensed film shooting schedule

A one-liner schedule or one-line schedule is a filmmaking term for a shorter version of the shooting schedule. This type of schedule usually omits information about cast and location.

== Content ==
As the name suggests, each scene or shooting day is summarized in a single line. Entries typically give the scene number and a brief description.

== Use ==
A one-liner schedule is derived from the script breakdown and the full shooting schedule, and gives producers, directors and department heads a quick overview of the shoot without the detail of the complete schedule.

== See also ==
- Shooting schedule
- Script breakdown
- Production board
- Day Out of Days
- Call sheet
