= WriterDuet =

Online screenwriting software

- WriterDuet Screenwriting Software
- Developer: WriterDuet Inc.
- Initial release: March 2013
- Stable release: v7 / May 2021
- Written in: Javascript
- Operating system: Web, Windows, Mac OS, iOS, Android
- Available in: English, Chinese, Spanish, French, Portuguese, Hebrew, others
- Type: Screenwriting software
- License: Proprietary
- Website: writerduet.com

WriterDuet is a screenwriting software for writing and editing screenplays and other forms of mass media.

== History ==
WriterDuet was founded in 2013 by Guy Goldstein.

In April 2015, WriterDuet acquired the domain for Scripped.com after they closed, citing a serious technical failure.

In August 2016, WriterDuet released a localized version of its software in China.

In May 2018, WriterDuet included Bechdel test analysis functions to address issues of gender diversity in the screenwriting industry.

In 2018, WriterDuet published WriterSolo, an offline version of their app that runs on the browser and opens/saves files on the computer, Dropbox, Google Drive, and iCloud.

In July 2019, WriterDuet made the WriterSolo browser app and desktop app available as pay-what-you-want under the web address FreeScreenwriting.com.

== Features ==
WriterDuet is primarily used to outline, write, and format screenplays to the standards recommended by the AMPAS. It also supports formats for theater, novels, and video games. The software is powered by Firebase allowing users to write together in real-time from multiple devices.

WriterDuet's main competitors in the screenwriting industry are Final Draft, Celtx, and Movie Magic Screenwriter.
