= Fade In (software) =

Software for writing screenplays

- Developer: GCC Productions Inc.
- Stable release: 5.0.15 / September 2026; 1 month ago
- Operating system: Windows, Mac OS X, Linux, iOS, Android
- Type: Screenwriting software
- Website: fadeinpro.com

Fade In Professional Screenwriting Software (also known simply as Fade In) is software for writing screenplays in the industry standard format used in Hollywood and elsewhere. It can also be used for teleplays, stage plays, radio plays, multimedia, graphic novels and other similar script formats.

Fade In is developed by Kent Tessman, a film director and screenwriter. The software was first released in 2011; the latest version 5.0.15 was released in 2026.

The desktop version of Fade In Professional Screenwriting Software is available for Windows, Mac OS X and Linux. Fade In Mobile is available for iOS (including both iPhone and iPad) and Android devices.

== Features ==
Fade In implements the standard functionality expected of a specialized screenwriting program, including formatting scenes, action, characters and dialogue in industry standard screenplay format.

Fade In provides key features needed by professional screenwriters. These features include revision management and page/scene locking which are required in a professional environment for managing rewrites through pre-production and production.

Fade In's developers have implemented a number of features that the other professional screenwriting programs lack, including full Unicode support, revision page colors, changing character names, full-screen editing, batch watermarking, and support for formats such as Final Draft, Open Screenplay Format, Fountain, and Scrivener. Some of Fade In's advantages in terms of text rendering and platform compatibility may be due to its more modern software architecture.

== Critical reception ==
Fade In Professional Screenwriting Software has been reviewed favorably.

PCWorld gave the software a score of five out of five, noting both its ease-of-use and professional feature set. MacWorld gave the software a score of 4.5 out of 5, mentioning that it has "all the major features—and then some—found in industry standard Final Draft, but at a quarter of the price". The software has also been reviewed favorably by Linux Journal.

The independent review site Top Ten Reviews ranked Fade In among the top screenwriting software along with Final Draft, Movie Magic Screenwriter and Celtx.

== See also ==
- List of screenwriting software
