= Practical Scriptwriter =

- Developer: Practical Software Design.
- Stable release: 2.73 / Feb 2017
- Operating system: Windows
- Size: 4MB
- Available in: English (American English)
- Type: Screenwriting software
- License: Proprietary
- Website: https://www.practicalscriptwriter.co.uk

Practical Scriptwriter is screenwriting software supporting various US and UK script formats (Stage, Screen, Television and Radio) as required by the BBC and US Screenwriting industry standards. The software runs on the Windows platform only.

The application is notable due to the separation of formatting information from the script itself. This separation is the opposite of a traditional WYSIWYG Word Processor, the data file format does not contain font and layout metadata, this is only applied during the formatting process. The software uses a proprietary file format identified by the .FSC file extension.

Originally released in 2005, the software was rewritten using Windows Presentation Foundation in 2012.
