= Script (comics) =

Narrative and dialogue of a comic book

A script is a document describing the narrative and dialogue of a comic book in detail. It is the comic book equivalent of a television program teleplay or a film screenplay.

In comics, a script may be preceded by a plot outline, and is almost always followed by page sketches drawn by a comics artist and inked, succeeded by the coloring and lettering stages. There are no prescribed forms of comic scripts, but there are two dominant styles in the mainstream comics industry, the full script (commonly known as "DC style") and the plot script (or "Marvel house style").

The creator of a script is known as a comics writer. (Note: Also comics scripter, comics author, comic book author, comics scribe, graphic novel writer, graphic novel author or graphic novelist)

== Styles ==
=== Full script ===
In this style, the comics writer breaks the story down in sequence, page-by-page and panel-by-panel, describing the action, characters, and sometimes backgrounds and "camera" points-of-view of each panel, as well as all captions and dialogue balloons. For decades, this was the preferred format for books published by DC Comics.

Peter David described his specific application of the full script method: "I break down each page on a panel by panel basis and label them as PANEL A, PANEL B, and so on. Then I describe what's in each panel, and then do the dialogue, numbering the balloons. I designate the panels with letters and the word balloons with numbers so as to minimize confusion for the letterer". In addition to writing the scripts, Jim Shooter drew layouts for the artist in his early work for DC.

The October 2018 issue of DC Comics' in-house previews magazine, DC Nation, featured a look at the creative process that writer Brian Michael Bendis and artists Ryan Sook, Wade von Grawbadger and Brad Anderson employed on Action Comics #1004, which included pages of Bendis' script that were broken down panel by panel, albeit without dialogue.

=== Plot script ===
In a plot script the artist works from a story synopsis from the writer (or plotter), rather than a full script. The artist creates page-by-page plot details on their own, after which the work is returned to the writer for the insertion of dialogue. Due to its widespread use at Marvel Comics beginning in the 1960s, primarily under editor-dialogist Stan Lee and writer-artists Jack Kirby and Steve Ditko, this approach became commonly known as the Marvel method or Marvel house style.

Comics historian Mark Evanier writes that this "new means of collaboration . . . was born of necessity—Stan was overburdened with work—and to make use of Jack's great skill with storylines. . . . Sometimes Stan would type up a written plot outline for the artist. Sometimes, not". As comic-book writer-editor Dennis O'Neil describes, the Marvel method "requires the writer to begin by writing out a plot and add[ing] words when the penciled artwork is finished. . . .[I]n the mid-sixties, plots were seldom more than a typewritten page, and sometimes less", while writers in later times "might produce as many as twenty-five pages of plot for a twenty-two page story, and even include in them snatches of dialog. So a Marvel Method plot can run from a couple of paragraphs to something much longer and more elaborate".

The Marvel method was in place with at least one artist by early 1961, as Lee described in 2009 when speaking of his and Ditko's "short, five-page filler strips ... placed in any of our comics that had a few extra pages to fill", most prominently in Amazing Fantasy but even previously in Amazing Adventures and other "pre-superhero Marvel" science-fiction/fantasy anthology titles.

I'd dream up odd fantasy tales with an O. Henry type twist ending. All I had to do was give Steve a one-line description of the plot and he'd be off and running. He'd take those skeleton outlines I had given him and turn them into classic little works of art that ended up being far cooler than I had any right to expect.

Advantages of the Marvel method over the full script method that have been cited by creators and industry professionals include:

- The fact that artists, who are employed to visualize scenes, may be better equipped to determine panel structure.
- The greater freedom this gives artists.
- The lower burden placed on the writer.

Cited disadvantages include:

- The fact that not all artists are talented writers, and some struggle over aspects such as plot ideas and pacing.
- It takes advantage of artists, who are typically paid for art alone even though they are essentially working as co-writers.

==== Kurtzman style ====
In a variation of the plot script, attributed to Harvey Kurtzman, the writer breaks down the story into page roughs or thumbnail sketches, with captions and dialogue jotted down inside the roughs. The artist (who is often the comic's writer as well) then fleshes out the roughs onto full-size art board. Writer/artists Frank Miller and Jeff Smith favor this style, as did Archie Goodwin.

==== EC style ====
Attributed to William Gaines (Kurtzman's publisher at EC Comics), the EC style is similar to the Kurtzman style, except the writer submits a tight plot to an artist, who breaks it down into panels that are laid out on the art board. The writer writes all captions and dialogue, which are pasted inside these panels, and then the artist draws the story to fit all of this paste-up. This laborious and restrictive way of creating comics is no longer in general use; the last artist to use even a variation of EC style was Jim Aparo.

== See also ==
- Glossary of comics terminology
- Script breakdown
- Screenwriting
- Storyboard
