= Day out of days =

Day out of days may refer to:

- Day out of Days (filmmaking), a chart used to tally days worked by cast members
- Day Out of Days (film), a 2015 drama film
- "Day Out of Days" (Dawson's Creek), a 2003 television episode
- Day Out of Days (book), a collection of stories by Sam Shepard
