= Dramatica (software) =

Dramatica Pro (Windows), Dramatica Story Expert (OS X)
- Original authors: Chris Huntley, Melanie Anne Phillips
- Developer: Write Brothers
- Stable release: 4.1 (Windows), 5 (OS X)
- Operating system: Windows, OS X
- Available in: English
- Type: Text editor, Screenwriting software
- License: Proprietary software (Shareware)
- Website: dramatica.com

Dramatica is the name of the theory and software suite created as part of a project by Chris Huntley and Melanie Anne Phillips. The term is used in the context of narratology and refers to a theory of narration and literary presentation. The software guides users through the writing process by giving them a step-by-step guide that focuses on plot and theme creation as well as story structure.

There are two different versions of the Dramatica software. The first, Dramatica Pro, was released in the 1990s and supports both Windows and OS X. The second, a more recent version, Dramatica Story Expert, is OS X-only.

The software has been turned into an online platform of writing tools (including the use of artificial intelligence) based on the work of James R. Hull.

== Theory ==
The theory was originated in 1994 as a diagnostic modelling tool built around a concept called "The Story Mind", which describes each story as having a mind of its own with its psychology built by the story's structure and its personality is determined by the storytelling.

Huntley and Phillips have taught the theory at the University of California at Los Angeles, where it was part of a twelve-week "for credit" course for several years. The two also released the book Dramatica – A New Theory of Story via Write Brothers Press, the publishing arm of Write Brothers founded by Stephen Greenfield and Chris Huntley.

The software is based upon Huntley and Phillips's quad theory, which is described as "[dividing] a story unit into four pieces and [creating] relationships between those parts". The four quads, which makes up the Dramatic Table of Story Elements, are the Universe (representing situations), Mind (attitudes), Physics (activities) and Psychology (manners of thinking).

In later years, the ongoing development of Dramatica was split into two branches. First is ongoing exploration into using the model to understand the workings of the human mind itself – an area of research called (by the theory creators) Mental Relativity. The second area of development is the implementation of the model as a patented computer program called "The Story Engine" which can be used to analyze story structures to find holes and inconsistencies and also used to interactively suggest how to fix and fill them.
