= Scripted (company) =

Online freelance writing marketplace

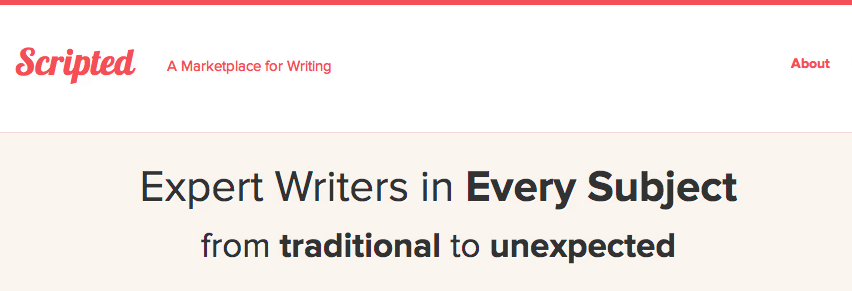
- Available in: English
- Founded: San Francisco, California
- Headquarters: 10845 Griffith Peak Dr #2, Las Vegas, NV 89135
- Founders: Sunil Rajaraman, Ryan Buckley
- Industry: Freelance Marketplace, Internet
- Services: Freelance Writing
- Subsidiaries: Scripped
- Website: www.scripted.com
- Registration: Required
- Users: 80,000
- Launched: May 11, 2011
- Current status: Active

Scripted is an online marketplace that connects businesses with freelance writers for blogs, articles, and bulk social media posts. Located in San Francisco, co-founders Sunil Rajaraman and Ryan Buckley launched Scripted as a byproduct of their scriptwriting company Scripped. Scripted pays freelance writers a flat rate to create copywriting for its clients. According to TechCrunch, Scripted has a pool of 80,000 freelancers as of November 2011, with 80% of those writers U.S. based.

== History ==
Scripted is administered by co-founders CEO Sunil Rajaraman and CFO Ryan Buckley. Before officially changing their focus from screenwriting to freelance writing in November 2011, Rajaraman and Buckley founded Scripped in 2008, an online company specializing in screenplay services. On March 29, 2010, Scripped announced a merger with screenwriting competitor Zhura. Rajaraman remained the merged company's Chief Executive Officer. Then, in May 2011, Rajaraman and Buckley launched offshoot site Scripted.com. In November 2011, it started with $700,000 in seed funding from investors Crosslink Capital, Shopzilla CIO Jody Mulkey, and LiveOps founder Douglas Feirstein. In February 2012, a new seed financing round resulted in an additional $150,000 led by former Redpoint Ventures Executive-in-Residence David Wu. The company recently partnered with Dana Brunetti and Kevin Spacey’s company Trigger Street Productions to introduce its new publishing website ShowWatcher. In June 2013, Scripted raised $4.5 million from Redpoint, Crosslink.
