= Movie Outline =

Word processing program

- Developer: Nuvotech Limited
- Stable release: 3.1.5
- Platform: Windows; Mac
- Type: Screenwriting software
- Website: www.movieoutline.com

Movie Outline is a word processing program developed by Nuvotech Limited. It is used to step outline a cinematic story and format a screenplay. It was created by Dan Bronzite, an English screenwriter. It was released in 2004 as an outliner with more features added in later releases.

The software is based on the principle of step-outlining, where a writer creates their story step-by-step before writing the screenplay. One of Movie Outline's features is its "Reference Plugins" which compare the writer's story with outlines and analyses of Hollywood movies.

== Program features ==
- Step outlining – allows development of the story, script and characters step-by-step
- Automatic script formatting – automatically formats the script as it is typed through auto-complete and keyboard shortcuts
- Character development – allows creation of character profiles
- Color-coded story structuring – the story and script can be structured into color-coded acts (or chapters if writing a novel, etc.) and the structures created can be saved as templates. Software includes sample templates such as the Hero's Journey (Mythic Structure) and the classic three-act structure
- Dialogue focus tools – allows isolation of voice-over or dialogue between two characters, allowing creation of unique characters and consistent voices
- Story analysis tools – uses "FeelFactors" to analyze the pacing of the story (conflict, tension, action, etc.) through a visual graph
- Reference movie breakdowns – includes outlines and analyses of successful produced Hollywood movies
- Drag and drop index cards – organizational tool that allows rearrangement of the story structures
- Cross-platform – documents can be exchanged between Windows and Mac platforms
- Import and export – imports plain text documents that have been written in standard word processors or other script-formatting software and automatically reformats them to industry standard screenplay format. Exports documents to many file formats including Rich Text, HTML (web page), Adobe Acrobat PDF and Movie Outline's own secure reference format

== History ==
Movie Outline was launched in early 2004 for Windows purely as an outliner. In 2005, Version 2 was released along with a Mac OS X version, adding new features including structuring tools and a story tasks "to do" list.

In 2007, Nuvotech Limited released Version 3 at the Screenwriting Expo in Los Angeles, California. This incarnation had evolved into a fully-fledged screenplay development application that now included professional script formatting features and character development tools. The product was well received by users and reviewers and highlighted the importance of outlining to the screenwriting community.

In 2010, Version 3.1 was released with over 100 new features and improvements and was offered for free to its existing users.

In 2017, Nuvotech re-launched Movie Outline under the new brand name of Script Studio with a slate of new features including a dedicated Novel Mode, Night Mode, Unicode and right-to-left language support, WYSIWYG Dual Dialogue, global Scratch Pad, new templates and an updated interface design.

=== System requirements ===
Windows

- 10/8/7/Vista/XP operating system
- 52 MB of free hard disk space
- 1 GHz CPU or higher
- Intel Pentium/Celeron Compatible Processor
- 512 MB of RAM
- VGA or higher monitor resolution

Mac OS

- OS X 10.5 or above
- 75 MB of free hard disk space
- 1 GHz CPU or higher
- G4 or above PowerPC or Intel processor
- 512 MB of RAM
- VGA or higher monitor resolution
