= Zhura =

Web-based screenwriting software

- Authorship highlighting on Zhura
- Developer: Zhura Corp.
- Initial release: 2007-12-10
- Operating system: Any (Web-based application)
- Type: screenwriting
- Website: http://www.scripped.com

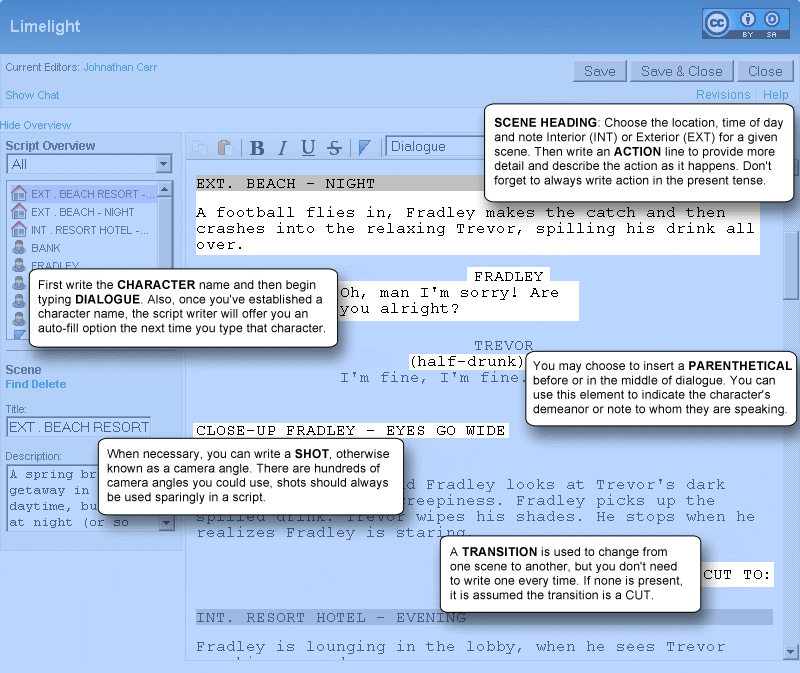
Script elements as described on the Zhura help pages.

Zhura (/ˈzɜːrə/ ZUR-ə) is a free, web-based screenwriting software application for writing and formatting screenplays to the film industry standard, as well as other formats. Zhura allows users to collaborate on scripts in public or private groups and uses Creative Commons Licensing for all work in the public workspace.

On March 29, 2010, Zhura announced its merger with Scripped. Scripped's CEO, Sunil Rajaraman, remains the company's Chief Executive Officer (CEO) as of 2022. The Zhura CEO was Eric MacDonald, a former Cascade Communications engineer. Scripped later closed on April 1, 2015 after a catastrophic, irrecoverable data loss.

== Script editor ==
Screenplay Template – The script editor provides a built-in screenplay template which formats the document to a standard for scripts as recommended by the AMPAS. The screenplay document is composed of seven elements: scene, action, character, dialogue, parenthetical, transition, and shot (see image). Each element has a specific style to which the script editor conforms as you type.
Script Formats – Other major script formats for stage play, sitcom, audio drama and comic book are also supported as well as the ability to switch between them.
Auto-Complete – Characters, scene headings and custom transitions are “remembered” as they are written and “recalled” with tab-completion when a writer starts a new character, scene heading or transition, respectively.
Multiple Editors – With a collaborative editing model comparable to Google Docs, two or more users can edit the same script simultaneously, regardless of having a different operating system or web browser.
Import/Export – A screenplay written in another program can be imported into the script editor and automatically conformed to the screenplay template. The closer the original script has adhered to the standard format, the better it will appear when imported. Supported import/export formats include Text (.txt) Word (.doc) Rich Text (.rtf) and OpenDocument (.odt). Scripts can also be exported as a PDF file with additional options.
Tracking Changes – Similar to the “tracking” feature in Microsoft Word, a user can review all changes made to a script in the revision history as well as highlight the contributions of each writer.
Offline Mode – The Google Gears-based offline functionality is in the process of being updated and is not available for new subscribers, according to the company founders.

== Community ==
Scripped supports typical social networking features such as discussion boards, comments, user profiles, public and private writing groups, internal web mail and instant messaging within the script editor. There is also the option to share scripts with others outside of Scripped by making scripts externally viewable. Scripped is made up entirely of user-generated scripts that other users can share, critique and edit, offering creative support to a community of writers.

== Licensing of user-created work ==
There are three types of work-spaces on Scripped (personal, group and public) with unique copyright and licensing management for the work created in each area. Any work a user originates may be moved from the personal area to a public or group area at any time. Once another user edits a script, however, it cannot be moved into the originator’s personal area.

Personal Workspace – Any script created or video uploaded in the user’s personal workspace remains copyrighted to that user. Until the user moves that script or video from their personal area into a group or public area, no other user shares a copyright or license to that work.

Private Group Workspace – The copyright to any script created or video uploaded in a private group workspace is allocated by the individual members of the group, however they see fit.

Public Workspace – Any script created or video uploaded in the public workspace is assigned a Creative Commons license by the originator of that work. The originator of a script may select one of four Creative Commons licenses before introducing that script to the public. The selection of the license is determined by what the author wants to allow others to do with the work. Below is a list of Creative Commons licenses available for all scripts and videos in the public workspace.

- Share Alike (BY-SA)

This license lets others remix, tweak, and build upon your work even for commercial reasons, as long as they credit the original user and license their new creations under the identical terms. This license is often compared to open source software licenses. All new works based on the original user's will carry the same license, so any derivatives will also allow commercial use.

- No Derivatives (BY-ND)

This license allows for redistribution, commercial and non-commercial, as long as it is passed along unchanged and in whole, with credit to the original user.

- Non-Commercial, No Derivatives (BY-NC-ND)

This license is the most restrictive of the four licenses, allowing redistribution. This license is often called the "free advertising" license because it allows others to download the original user work and share them with others as long as they mention the original user and link back to them, but they can't change them in any way or use them commercially.

- Non-Commercial, Share Alike (BY-NC-SA)

This license lets others remix, tweak, and build upon the original user's work non-commercially, as long as they credit the original user and license their new creations under the identical terms. Others can download and redistribute the original user's work just like the BY-NC-ND license, but they can also translate, make remixes, and produce new stories based on the original user's work. All new work based on the original user's work will carry the same license, so any derivatives will also be non-commercial in nature.

== Events ==
In April 2008, Zhura partnered with Improv Asylum, a comedy troupe in Boston, Massachusetts to produce a live sketch comedy show called "You Wrote It, Live" entirely written by the public on Zhura. Another show was produced in June.

== See also ==
- Web 2.0
- Screenwriting
- Creative Commons
- List of screenwriting software
