= The Bold Italic =

American online publication

- Editor: Saul Sugarman
- Categories: San Francisco culture
- First issue: September 3, 2009
- Country: United States
- Based in: San Francisco
- Language: English
- Website: thebolditalic.com

The Bold Italic is an online publication based in San Francisco. It was founded as an online magazine in 2009, as a collaboration between design firm IDEO and media company Gannett.

== History ==
The Bold Italic was conceived in 2009 by Michael Maness, then Gannett's head of innovation, and the design firm IDEO, who set out to build a new kind of local publication driven by the personality and firsthand discoveries of San Francisco residents, rather than traditional top-down criticism. "For the first couple years, there were only five of us on staff and our office was often little more than a co-working space with all of us crammed around a single table," said Jennifer Maerz, one of The Bold Italic's initial editors. Eventually, The Bold Italic operated a headquarters in San Francisco's Hayes Valley neighborhood. The space was designed by DIY teacher Kelly Malone, who decorated three floors and nine rooms that included a workspace, an events room, a game room, and a rec room.

The Bold Italic covers culture, events, local businesses and news in San Francisco, and it has been popular for series such as event-based bingo cards, Kid Food Reviews, and Made Up Charts. Coverage focus has been based on the city of San Francisco, but has often included Oakland, the greater Bay Area, and for a brief time around 2015, Los Angeles.

The Bold Italic has also produced events. In December 2012, it hosted "Gift Shop," a holiday marketplace of San Francisco-made goods at its own event space, in partnership with the 5M Project. Other events staged during the publication's first five years included block parties, a recurring "Big Gay Birthday" party, a creativity conference, neighborhood dinners produced with Stag Dining Group, formal dances, and an evening at the San Francisco Zen Center that paired meditation with experimental music. The magazine also ran a multi-city "Bold Rush" tour down the West Coast to Los Angeles, Portland, and Seattle.

== Ownership changes ==
Gannett shuttered the magazine in 2015 amid a broader restructuring, and, according to a local news story, the company's sales department circulated an email offering the brand for sale "to the tune of 5+ million". Scripted co-founder Sunil Rajaraman and tech writer Sonia Arrison bought The Bold Italic in late 2015. In 2019, the magazine was acquired by Medium. In 2023, Medium transferred ownership of the publication to GrowSF, a moderate-leaning political pressure group, and journalist Saul Sugarman was appointed as the editor-in-chief. In 2026, Sugarman announced that The Bold Italic had been independently owned by him since August 2025.

== Awards ==
The Bold Italic was a Webby honoree and an IDSA finalist, and was named best webzine by SF Weekly. In 2024, it won a San Francisco Press Club award for its photo coverage of the Sisters of Perpetual Indulgence event, Hunky Jesus. In 2020, Jaya Padmanabhan also won a Press Club award for her story, "For Aging Immigrants, Food from Their Homelands Is Key to Happiness."
