= Pre-production =

Phase of producing a film or television show

Pre-production is the process of planning some of the elements involved in a film, television show, play, video game, or other performance, as distinct from production and post-production. Pre-production ends when the planning ends and the content starts being produced.

== In film ==
Pre-production formally begins once a project has been greenlit. It involves finalizing the script, hiring the actors and crew, finding locations, determining what equipment is needed, and figuring out the budget. At this stage, finalizing preparations for production goes into effect. Financing will generally be confirmed and many of the key elements such as principal cast members, director, and cinematographer are set. By the end of pre-production, the screenplay is usually finalized and satisfactory to all the financiers and other stakeholders.

During pre-production, the script is broken down into individual scenes with storyboards and all the locations, props, cast members, costumes, special effects, and visual effects are identified. An extremely detailed shooting schedule is produced and arrangements are made for the necessary elements to be available to the film-makers at the appropriate times. Sets are constructed, the crew is hired, financial arrangements are put in place and a start date for the beginning of principal photography is set. At some point in pre-production, there will be a read-through of the script which is usually attended by all cast members with speaking parts, the director, all heads of departments, financiers, producers, and publicists.

== In music ==
In the music industry, pre-production is a process whereby a recording artist spends time creating and refining their musical ideas. The artist thus produces a song's demo recording, or rough draft, in order to establish the song's creative premise. This reduces the time and money spent in expensive studios. The goal is to enter into the major recording phase of production with the basic and most promising ideas having been already established.

Notable producers who preferred this process have included Bruce Fairbairn and Bob Rock. They have both produced successful albums such as Bon Jovi's Slippery When Wet, Mötley Crüe's Dr. Feelgood, Metallica's The Black Album, and Aerosmith's Permanent Vacation.

== In industry ==
Before manufacturing and mass production can ensue, industries have to go through a crucial period of creatively developing plans on the basis of criteria backed by science and or culture. Different iterations of these plans are carefully tested, collecting data that result in higher levels of efficiency, quality, and or profitability.

== See also ==
- Casting (performing arts)
- Film budgeting
- Outline of film
- Movie production incentives in the United States
- Post-production
- Production board
- Production strip
- Screenplay (script)
- Screenwriting
- Video game development
