= Celtx =

Media pre-production software

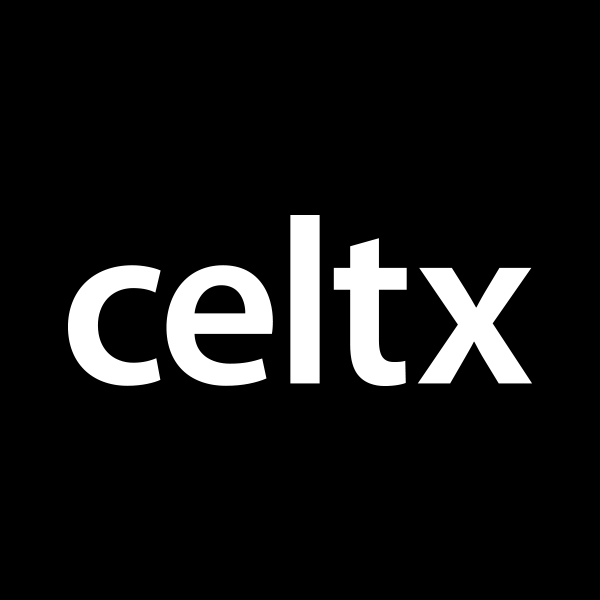

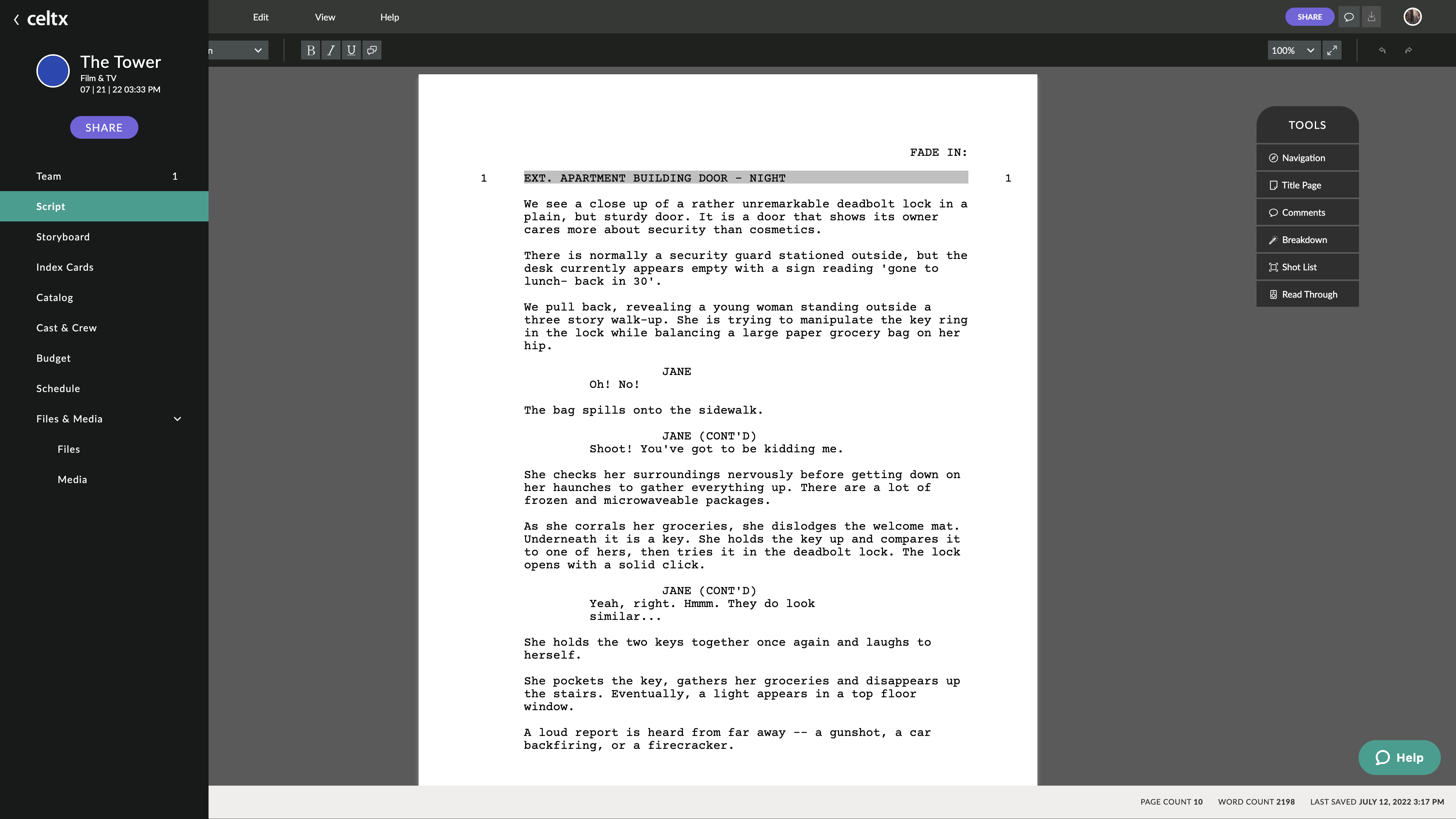
- Celtx Studio
- Developer(s): Celtx Inc.
- Stable release: 3.0 (August 2022)
- Operating system: Cross-platform
- Platform: Cloud Based
- Type: Screenwriting and media pre-production software
- License: Mozilla Public License version 2.0
- Website: www.celtx.com

Celtx (/ˈkɛltɪks/) is media pre-production software, designed for creating and organizing media projects like screenplays, films, videos, stageplays, documentaries, machinima, games, and podcasts. The software is developed by Celtx Inc., which is owned by Boston, Massachusetts-based media company Backlight.

== History ==
Celtx's developer Celtx Inc. was founded as Greyfirst in 2000 in St. John's by entrepreneurs Mark Kennedy and Chad House. "Celtx" is an acronym for Crew, Equipment, Location, Talent and XML. Its Celtx pre-production software launched that year as a desktop service. The software was originally designed for small and independent production companies.

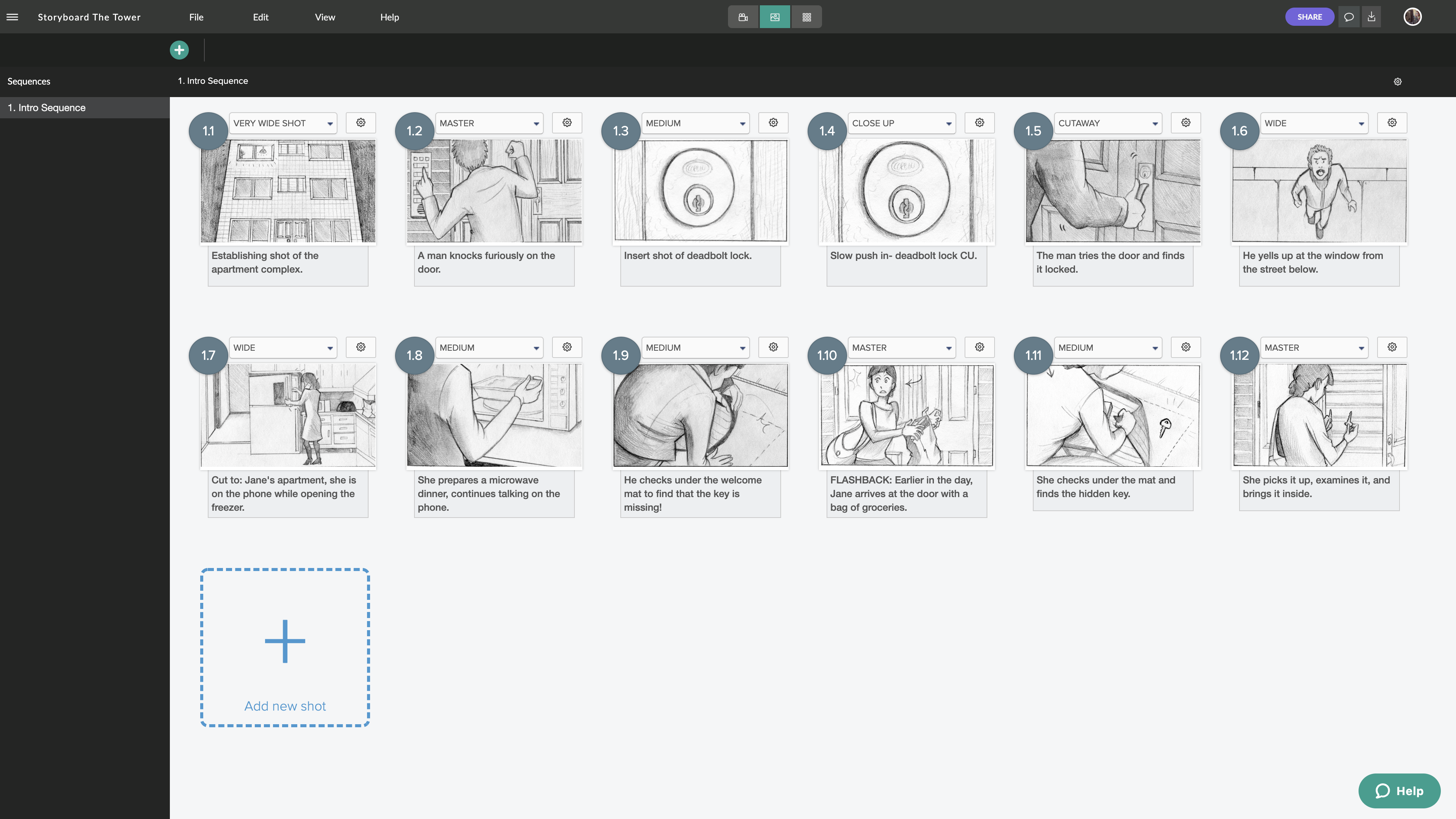
A screenshot of the Celtx Studio's Storyboard tool.

The original desktop software was built atop the open-source Firefox browser, allowing hybrid online/offline operation. By June 2013, Celtx software was available as a subscription web service, in addition to a desktop version.

In December 2014, Celtx developer Greyfirst changed its name to Celtx Inc.

As of September 21, 2022, the latest version of the software shown on the Apple store was version 3.0.

== Features ==
Celtx is scriptwriting and collaboration software for screenwriters; film and television producers; and producers of theater, radio, podcasts and comics.

Writing
Celtx uses an industry standard screenwriting editor typical for screenplays and stageplays. Celtx also includes a rich text editor module for writing novels.

Project collaboration, management and storage
Celtx Studio offers project collaboration and online file storage.

Publishing
Scripts can be uploaded to the Celtx Exchange for public viewing, peer reviews and commentary.

Scheduling
Celtx supports creation of production calendars, stripboards, shooting schedules, and call sheets.

Elements
Celtx features thirty-five different elements, such as Actor or Special Effects, that can be added to the project. These elements can have various information added to them, such as media or text. Celtx allows directors and writers to tag elements within each script. These tagged elements can then be automatically transferred to a script breakdown.

=== Pre-production visualization tools ===
Storyboarding
Celtx allows people to create storyboard sequences, which can be printed or viewed using Celtx's built-in animatic playback feature.

Shot Blocker
The Shot Blocker tool can be used to draw a sketch or setup which can also be added to a storyboard. The Shot Blocker includes pre-loaded icons and imagery for cameras, lights and people that can be tagged with text, and tools for drawing lines, arrows, shapes and text.

== Technology ==
Celtx originates from desktop software built on open, non-proprietary standards (e.g., HTML, XML and RDF) and licensed under the Mozilla Public License version 2.0. Feature development and language translations of the application were driven largely by the feedback and volunteer efforts of members of the international Celtx community.

== Developer ==
Celtx software is developed by St. John's, Newfoundland and Labrador-based Celtx Inc. Celtx, Inc. is owned by Boston, Massachusetts-based Backlight, a media technology company founded in 2022. Backlight also owns four other media software businesses: ftrack, iconik, Wildmoka and Zype.

== See also ==
- List of screenwriting software
