= Production board =

Scheduling chart in filmmaking

A production board, stripboard, or production strip is a filmmaking term for a chart displaying color-coded strips of paper, each containing information about a scene in the film's shooting script. The strips can then be rearranged and laid out sequentially to represent the order one wants to film in, providing a schedule that can be used to plan the production. This is done because most films are shot "out of sequence," meaning that they do not necessarily begin with the first scene and end with the last. For logistical purposes, scenes are often grouped by talent or location and are arranged to accommodate the schedules of cast and crew. A production board is not to be confused with a stripboard used for electronics prototyping.

Historically, strip boards were manually assembled by hand on specially-made multi-panel boards made of vinyl or wood, about 15 to 18 inches tall (38 to 45 cm), whose panels could be easily folded up. In the 21st century, such boards are obsolete, and aspiring filmmakers are no longer routinely trained in how to use them. In contemporary filmmaking, a digital version of a strip board is prepared with dedicated computer software applications, of which the most popular one is Movie Magic Scheduling from Entertainment Partners. Other popular applications include Celtx, Gorilla Scheduling, Scenechronize and Yamdu. It is also possible to create a digital strip board by customizing general-purpose spreadsheet software such as OpenOffice.org Calc or Microsoft Excel.

== Main purpose ==
The production board is an essential element of the filmmaking process, because the sequence in which scenes are shot during principal photography normally does not follow their chronological sequence in the script. The sequence usually depends on organizational aspects such as the availability of the cast, crew, and locations, and, in the case of outdoor shots, factors such as the season, weather and light conditions. The production board is the project planning tool used by the unit production manager (or sometimes the first assistant director) to develop the actual sequence in which scenes will be shot.

Most importantly, to save money, the production team will identify all scenes that involve the same location, cast, and crew and group them together as much as possible so they can be shot together all at once. Actually shooting together all planned shots at a location is colloquially known as "shooting out" a location. Since actors are normally paid a "day rate," it makes more sense from a financial perspective, for example, to shoot all three scenes involving a particular actor and location on a single day (even though the scenes may occur in completely different parts of the script), rather than paying the actor's day rate three times to bring back the same actor to the same location on three different days just to speak a few lines each day. Shooting scenes out of order helps avoid the cost of having to repeatedly travel back to the same locations or reassemble the same sets, but requires considerable effort from both cast and crew members—especially the script supervisor—to maintain the illusion of continuity.

== Other variables ==
Many variables affect the sequence of scenes as they are arranged and rearranged on a strip board, until everything falls into place.

The specific time(s) of year reserved for shooting will in turn affect the season in which the film apparently takes place and how much daytime is available. Local climate extremes can severely limit the number of hours available for shooting exterior scenes, if cast and crew become incapacitated by hypothermia or hyperthermia. Real-world practical locations are often occupied by existing users who impose severe limitations on the days and times available for shooting. For maximum scheduling flexibility, a common filmmaking trick is to film day for night or night for day, but small independent productions cannot always afford the necessary lighting setups and must rely on whatever light is already available on location.

Some directors and actors prefer to film scenes in chronological order as much as possible, especially scenes involving heightened emotional states, like heated arguments, where it would be awkward to film the end of an argument first. Outdoor scenes subject to fickle weather conditions and difficult stunts and special effects are sometimes scheduled early in principal photography, so there is time to recover and make necessary changes if problems arise. Some producers prefer to schedule intimate scenes later in principal photography, to give the lead actors some time to become comfortable with each other. Some producers arrange for alternative "cover sets" near exterior locations, so they can immediately relocate the production to shooting interior scenes on the cover set if an exterior location is rendered unusable by bad weather.

Some scenes need long lead times to set up properly, such as in-car dialogue scenes for which a car is usually fitted with movie cameras and towed during the filming. Unless the entire production is shot only at one location, each "company move" of the cast and crew between locations may take up significant amounts of time.

If any actor is a bankable star at the peak of their career with tightly limited availability, the production must work around that star's schedule. Child actors are often subject to legal restrictions on the number of hours they can work per day. Children also tend to have less patience and stamina (relative to adults) before their ability to deliver a high-quality performance is exhausted.

Shooting in a cost-efficient manner only gets even harder if the production team decides to use unionized talent. For example, in the United States, the Screen Actors Guild requires payment for "hold" days in between nonconsecutive shooting days at remote locations, as well as a minimum of 12 hours of turnaround time between shoots, which means the same actors cannot be scheduled for a day shoot at dawn the next day after a night shoot expected to run past midnight. If an actor has more than ten hold days, the production must do a "drop-pickup," in which the actor is dropped from contract and released to work on other projects, then picked up later to resume working on the film. If an actor has less than 10 days between shoots, they may become eligible for pay at a weekly rate rather than a daily rate, even if they are not used on every day of the week. Under SAG-AFTRA rules, it is sometimes possible to hire actors who work for free or on deferred-salary arrangements, but such actors usually have regular full- or part-time jobs that may limit their availability.

== Common contents ==
Information on the strips can include:

- The scene number
- The day (Sunrise/Morning/Noon/Afternoon/Evening/Sunset/Night)
- The number of pages in that scene
  - This is commonly counted in eighths of a page.
- The set that is described in the script
- The actual location that will be filmed
- The characters in that scene
- Miscellaneous notes on the production

== Color Conventions ==
Production strip boards are often color-coded according to the following convention; StudioBinder and Scenechronize use a slightly modified convention; finally, Movie Magic Scheduling has its own standard:

Description	Strip Color generic Production	Strip Color StudioBinder	Strip Color Scenechronize	Strip Color Movie Magic Scheduling
Sunrise Exterior	-	-	Pink	-
Morning	-	-	-	Pink
Day Interior	White	White	White	White
Day Exterior	Yellow	Yellow	Yellow	Yellow
Sunset Exterior	-	-	Orange	-
Evening Exterior	-	Dark Red	-	Orange
Evening Interior		Brown		
Night Interior	Blue	Blue	Blue	Green
Night Exterior	Green	Green	Green	Blue
Day Separator	Black	Black	Black	Grey
Week Separator	Orange	-	-	-
Omitted Scene	-	-	Red	-
Disabled Scene	-	-	Grey	-
Free Day	Grey	-	-	-
Holiday	Red	-	-	-

== See also ==
- Production schedule
- Shooting schedule
- One liner schedule
- Filmmaking
