= Scenechronize =

Computer software platform

- Industry: software
- Founded: December 2003
- Founder: Hunter Hancock; Darren Ehlers
- Headquarters: San Francisco, California
- Area served: California
- Parent: Clever Machine Inc.

Scenechronize (stylized as scenechronize) is a computer software platform, developed by Clever Machine Inc., for television and movie production companies. Its purpose is to reduce the need for paper materials used during the production process, in order to reduce waste.

== Origins ==
Clever Machine was founded in December 2003 and incorporated in California. The founders, Hunter Hancock, chief executive officer, and Darren Ehlers, chief operations officer, and five engineers had originally provided customized solutions to financial services companies, assisting in marketing and engineering positions with multiple enterprise software companies. The company's first project was to provide an outsourced information technology team to a financial services company. From there, the company was able to begin its own software company, Scenechronize, after purchasing a business plan from Rhys Ryan, who also joined the company.

Using a Web-based user interface, Scenechronize organizes different production aspects — the script, locations, casting, breakdown elements, and schedule. Tools have been specifically created for assistant directors, line producers, above-the-line and below-the-line crews. Each team member has access to his or her own department, while the unit production manager or line producer maintains an overall view, with the option to share that information with other crew members on an as-needed basis.

In 2008, a preview release of Scenechronize was demonstrated to art directors and unit production managers. The beta release of Scenechronize was announced at the Sundance Film Festival in 2009, with the initial public release announced a year later, also at Sundance.

== Today ==
The company's engineering offices are in San Francisco, while the sales and support offices were in Burbank, California.

In November 2012, Ease Entertainment, a payroll and production accounting/financial tracking software firm, acquired the assets of Scenechronize. All existing employees of Scenechronize were retained with operations in their Burbank offices being relocated to Ease's headquarters in Beverly Hills.

In August 2015, Entertainment Partners (EP), a payroll and production accounting/financial tracking software firm, acquired the assets of Ease Entertainment including Scenechronize. All existing employees of Scenechronize were retained with operations in the Beverly Hills office relocated to EP's offices in Burbank, California.

In April 2019, Entertainment Partners was acquired by private equity firm Texas Pacific Group (TPG).

== Companies and productions ==
=== Network television ===
- ABC – No Ordinary Family • FlashForward • Ugly Betty • American Crime
- AMC – The Walking Dead • Rubicon
- CBS – 90210
- HBO
- DreamWorks Television
- Showtime – United States of Tara • Dexter
- Sony Pictures Television – Breaking Bad
- Valhalla Entertainment
- Warner Bros. Television

=== Movie productions ===
- Bad Robot
- Columbia Pictures – Premium Rush
- Lakeshore Entertainment
- The Montecito Picture Company
- Playtone
- Screen Gems
- Skydance Productions
- Spyglass Entertainment
- 20th Century Fox – Water for Elephants • We Bought a Zoo
- Universal Studios – Bridesmaids • Larry Crowne
- Warner Bros. – Due Date
