= Movie Magic Screenwriter =

Screenwriting software

- Word Processor/Formatter for screenplays, television, stage et al.
- Developer: Write Brothers, Inc.
- Stable release: 6.0
- Operating system: Windows and Mac OS X
- Type: Screenwriting software
- Website: www.screenplay.com

Movie Magic Screenwriter is a word processing program sold by Write Brothers to format screenplays, teleplays and novels. It began life in the 1990s under the playful name ScriptThing, running as a native MS-DOS application. It was one of the earliest products that permitted genuine WYSIWYG (What You See Is What You Get) editing and formatting in real time.

In the early days of PCs, starting in the 1980s, most screenwriting products (like Scriptor and some Word add-ons) required the user to create the text in one step, and then generate the formatted script as a second step. Although inconvenient, this was a big help because screenplay formatting has such strict requirements, and for many writers it was the top choice for many years.

But WYSIWYG writing/formatting was the Holy Grail. Soon ScriptThing competitors included Final Draft, Scriptware, MovieMaster, and others. Most of these began life as native MS-DOS applications. In the late 1990s, ScriptThing for Windows appeared and was widely accepted not just for its performance but also its lack of copy-protection and ease of use.

This was the version that was purchased by Screenplay Systems, the creators of Scriptor and other products. They renamed the company as Write Brothers, and the ScriptThing software as Movie Magic Screenwriter.

== History ==
Stephen Greenfield and Chris Huntley created Scriptor, one of the earliest screenplay writing programs, that worked by converting word processor documents into screenplay style. The program's importance was highlighted by an Academy Award for technical achievement in 1994. Scriptor later purchased ScriptThing, another screenwriting program, which was combined into Movie Magic Screenwriter. The program was considered an industry standard, along with Final Draft.

The Mac version of Screenwriter won a Macworld Editor's Choice Award for the year 2000. From 2003 to 2006, Screenwriter was the script-writing team's preferred tool on the popular BBC series Doctor Who.

== See also ==
- List of screenwriting software
