= Write Brothers =

Write Brothers, Inc.
- Type: Software Publisher
- Industry: Software/Entertainment
- Founded: 1982
- Headquarters: Glendale, California, U.S.
- Website: write-bros.com

Write Brothers, Inc. is an American computer software publisher founded in 1982 by Stephen Greenfield and Chris Huntley as Screenplay Systems. The company's first program was Scriptor, the world's first screenplay formatter. The company's programs are designed specifically for writers with their flagship programs Movie Magic Screenwriter, Dramatica Pro and StoryView.
