= Day out of days (filmmaking) =

The Day Out of Days is a chart used by producers of motion picture entertainment in the USA to tally the number of paid days for each cast member. The chart must be prepared after the shooting schedule. Once it has been completed, work can begin on a budget.

The Day Out of Days is arranged as a grid, with columns representing days and rows representing cast members. Letters are used to indicate paid days. Typically, W is used to indicate a work day (the cast member will perform on that day), T indicates a travel day, and R a rehearsal day. All three count as paid days.

The letters S (Start) and F (Finish) are used to indicate the first and last paid days. For example, a cast member's first paid day (usually a rehearsal day) appears as SR; the last paid day (usually a work day) appears as WF.

Special consideration must be given to idle periods in the Day Out of Days. A cast member can either be held (paid) or dropped (not paid) during an idle period. The Screen Actors Guild has very specific rules addressing when an actor can—or especially cannot—be dropped. (The rules do not apply for actors with "run-of-show" agreements.)

In the Day Out of Days chart, hold days are indicated by an H. When a cast member is to be dropped, a D marks the last paid day before the drop, and a P indicates the day when the cast member will be picked back up.

== Letters ==
- W = paid work day (the cast member will perform on that day)
- T = paid travel day
- R = paid rehearsal day
- S = first paid start day
- F = last paid finish day
- SR = cast member's first paid day (usually a rehearsal day)
- WF = cast member's last paid day (usually a work day)
- H = hold days
- D = last paid day before the drop
- P = day when will be picked back up
