= Shooting script =

Screenplay used during film production

A shooting script is the version of a screenplay used during the production of a film or video. It provides a plan for what footage to shoot to help tell the story.

Shooting scripts are distinct from spec scripts in that they make use of scene numbers (along with certain other formatting conventions described below), and they follow a well-defined set of procedures specifying how script revisions should be implemented and circulated.

== Overview ==
When a screenplay is approved for production, the scenes are assigned numbers which are included in the script alongside the scene headers. The numbers provide a convenient way for the various production departments to reference individual scenes. Each individual shot within a scene is also numbered.

After a shooting script has been widely circulated, page numbers are locked, and any revisions are distributed on revision pages. Thus the production office might issue a revision containing new pages 3, 9, 17 and 45. This avoids having to print and distribute an entirely new draft for every set of revisions, which would entail crew members having to transfer all their handwritten notes to a new script. If scenes on page 45 become longer, they will be continued on new pages 45A, 45B and so on; if the scenes on page 45 are all eliminated, a new page 45 will be issued with the word "OMITTED" as the absence of a page 45 might look like an error.

Revision pages are distributed on colored paper, a different color for each set of revisions, with each changed line marked by an asterisk in the right margin of the page. The progression of colors varies from one production to the next, but a typical sequence would be: white, blue, pink, yellow, green, goldenrod, buff, salmon, cherry, tan, ivory, white (this time known as "double white"), and back to blue ("double blue").

When the assistant director believes that there are more changed pages than are worth swapping out, the script coordinator may issue an entirely fresh script in the appropriate revision color. In some cases, usually before the start of principal photography, an entirely new "white draft" will be distributed in lieu of colored revision pages. The pages in a white draft are renumbered from scratch, while the original scene numbers are maintained.

== Preserving scene and page numbers ==
When revisions are made to a shooting script, they must be accomplished in a way that does not disturb the pre-existing scene numbers. Changes made to scene numbers are to be reflected before the original scene number, as what follow a scene number identifies a specific setup within the scene actually shot during production.

For example: For US production standards if a new scene is to be inserted between scenes 10 and 11, the new scene will be numbered A11 (and not 10A as "10A" would refer to setup "A" of scene 10, when using the American slating system – see slating procedures). For some productions, it may be necessary to insert a scene between 10 and A11 – this scene is then numbered AA11. A scene between A11 and 11 would be numbered B11. A scene between A11 and B11 would be numbered AB11. For UK production standards if a new scene is to be inserted between scenes 10 and 11, the new scene will be numbered 10A. Where it is necessary to insert a scene between 10 and 10A – this scene is then numbered 10aA. A scene between 10A and 11 would be numbered 10B . A scene between 10A and 10B would be numbered 10AA.

Every scene thus retains its own unique number throughout the course of the production. When a scene is omitted, its number is preserved in the script along with the phrase (OMITTED). This effectively retires the number so that it cannot be reused by a new scene inserted later at the same location. A scene can also be unomitted, effectively bringing the retired scene out of retirement.

Page numbers in a shooting script are handled in a similar way. When revision pages are distributed, the page numbers must flow sequentially into the pre-existing page numbers. For example, if page 10 is revised such that it now occupies a page and a half, the revisions will be distributed on two pages numbered 10 and 10A. These two pages will replace page 10 in the outstanding drafts. Conversely, if pages 15 and 16 are shortened such that they now can occupy a single page, the revisions will be distributed on a single page numbered 15–16, or blank space is retained on each page to maintain the original page numbering, i.e. 14 as is, 15 half blank, 16 half blank, 17 as is.

== Revision slug ==
A slug (header) appears at the top of every revision page, aligned vertically with the page number. The revision slug typically includes the date the revisions were circulated, the color of the pages in parentheses, and usually, the name of the production or some other descriptive information. Every set of revisions is distributed along with a title page that includes a list of the revision slugs for every set of revisions distributed thus far.

== Revision marks ==
Script revisions are marked with asterisks in the right hand margins of the revision pages. When many revision marks are present on a single page, or within a single paragraph or scene, the marks may be consolidated into a single mark. For example, if all the lines in a given passage of dialogue are marked, the marks can be consolidated into a single mark appearing alongside the name of the speaker above the dialogue. In the case of scenes, this single "consolidation mark" appears alongside the scene header. For pages, the consolidation mark appears beside the page number.

== Software ==
Most screenwriting software applications include functions for handling the formats and procedures described above, with varying degrees of automation.

== See also ==
- Screenplay
- Screenwriting
- Screenwriting software
- Spec script
- Storyboard
- List of motion picture-related topics
