= Assistant director =

Film management and logistics role

The role of an assistant director (AD) on a film includes tracking daily progress against the filming production schedule, arranging logistics, preparing daily call sheets, checking cast and crew, and maintaining order on the set. They also have to take care of the health and safety of the crew. The role of an assistant to the film director is often confused with assistant director, but the responsibilities are entirely different. The assistant to the film director manages all of the directors in development, pre-production, while on set, through post-production, and is often involved in both personnel management as well as creative aspects of the production process.

Historically, assistant directing was a stepping stone to directing work: Alfred Hitchcock was an assistant, as well as Akira Kurosawa. This was when the role was more general and encompassed all aspects of filmmaking such as set design and script editing. This transition into film directing is no longer common in feature films, as the role has evolved into a more logistical and managerial position. It is more common now for an assistant director to transition to a theatre production management or producer role than to directing, with contemporary exceptions such as James McTeigue.

== Sub-roles ==
Often, the role of assistant director is broken down into the following sub-roles:

- The first assistant director (first or 1st AD) has overall AD responsibilities and supervises the second AD (2AD). The "first" is directly responsible to the director and "runs" the floor or set. The first AD and the unit production manager are two of the highest "below the line" technical roles in filmmaking (as opposed to creative or "above the line" roles) and so, in this strict sense, the role of first AD is non-creative. Their responsibility is to keep the production on schedule throughout the day, communicate to the entire crew, and to maintain the safety and security of the staff and shot itself. An assistant director must be very good at estimating how long a scene will take. (Sometimes a scene running a few pages long on the screenplay can be shot relatively quickly, while a half page emotional key moment may take all day.) The first AD is paid very well to keep the production on track, and is usually the first person to be replaced (i.e., fired) if the production strays too far from its original schedule or budget.
- The second assistant director (second or 2nd AD) creates the daily call sheets from the production schedule, in cooperation with the production coordinator. The "second" also serves as the "backstage manager", liaising with actors and putting cast through make-up and wardrobe, which relieves the "first" of these duties. Supervision of the second second assistant director, third assistant director, assistant director trainees, and the setting of background (extras) are parts of the "second's" duties.
  - The second second assistant director (second second or 2nd 2nd AD) deals with the increased workload of a large or complicated production. For example, a production with a large cast may require the division of the aspects of backstage manager and the call sheet production work to two separate people.
- The third assistant director (third or 3rd AD) works on set with the "First" and may liaise with the "Second" to move actors from base camp (the area containing the production, cast, and hair and make-up trailers), organize crowd scenes, and supervise one or more production assistants (PA). There is sometimes no clear distinction between a 2AD and a 3AD. Although some industry bodies, such as the Directors Guild of America, have defined the roles in an objective way, others believe it to be a subjective distinction. In general, the 3rd AD is a term used outside the United States and is sometimes synonymous with the role of a 2nd 2nd AD inside the US.
- The additional assistant director (AAD or Additional), or fourth assistant director (4AD or "fourth"), or "key production assistant" (key PA), may have a number of duties. Most commonly, the AAD has two broad job functions. One is the contraction of the duties of an AD where the AD acts as both second AD and third AD simultaneously. For example, a production with many cast may pass the 2AD call sheet production work to that of the AAD, especially when the 2AD is already performing the additional work of a third AD. The other main use of an AAD is as an adjunct to the 3AD and 1AD for logistically large scenes where more ADs are needed to control large numbers of extras. The "Additional" may also serve where the complexity of the scene or specialized elements within it (stunts, period work) require, or are best served by, a dedicated AD in most respects equal to a first AD - directing and controlling a number of other ADs to direct action to the satisfaction of the 1AD and the director.
- A production assistant is one of the lowest crew in a film's hierarchy in terms of salary and authority. They perform various duties required of them by ADs.

The sub-roles of assistant directors differ among nations. For example, the distinction between second second AD and third AD is more common in North America. British and Australian productions, rather than having a second second AD, will hire a "second" 2AD experienced in the same duties, and trained to the same level, to allow a division of the duties. 3ADs in Britain and Australia have different duties from a second second AD, and the terms are not synonymous.

== Calling the roll ==
One of the first AD's most important responsibilities is to "call the roll" — that is, call out a series of specific cues for each take to ensure that all cast and crew on set are aware of exactly what is going on so they can perform their particular role at the appropriate moment. Over the years, special procedures have been developed for this task to achieve maximum efficiency during shooting, which are usually some variant of the following:

1. "Waiting on..." Though not technically part of calling the roll, first ADs may keep the set focused by frequently calling out which department is responsible for a delay in rolling a take. If the lights need to be adjusted, the first AD calls out, "waiting on lighting". If the actors are still in their trailer, the first AD calls out "Waiting on talent", etc. However, such calls can be regarded as applying excessive pressure to the department in question.
2. "Final checks, please" (or "last looks"). Once everyone is in place, and rehearsals and blocking have finished, the first AD calls out, "final checks" or "checks". This is the signal for any last minute adjustments, especially to hair, makeup, wardrobe, and props.
3. Traditionally, the first AD calls "quiet on the set". However, it is more common in current productions to hear first, "Picture is up!" (or, "Rehearsal's up", accordingly), followed by "Quiet please!" to alert everyone that the take is ready and imminent. "Lock it down", or more commonly "Lock it Up", is also a signal (particularly on location) to ensure nothing interrupts the take. This call is crucial for third assistant directors, as this is their primary responsibility during a take.
4. "Turnover". While most AD's say both "roll sound" and "roll camera", "turnover" signals both the camera and sound departments to start rolling. The sound department will roll first. After a second or two, the sound recordist will confirm that the recording equipment is running at the correct speed by calling "Speed" or "Sound Speed". Hearing this, the clapper loader immediately calls out the "Scene" and "Take" numbers so that these details are on the recording. Simultaneously, (or within a very few seconds) the camera operator or focus puller will roll the camera, and as soon as the camera is confirmed as running at the correct speed, will call for the clapper-loader to "mark it" (or "smack it", "bang it", "tag it", etc.). This is done by showing the slate ("clapperboard") on camera, and bringing the clapper down to make a synchronisation point for audio (the sound of the clapper) and picture (the two parts of the clapper being seen to come together). With the slate quickly taken out of shot, and the camera refocused or repointed as necessary for the opening framing, the camera operator calls "set" or "frame" to indicate that all is ready to capture the action.
5. The responsibility to call "action" is shared by either the first assistant director or the director, depending on the director's preference. "Action" may be preceded by "background action" if extras must be in motion in the shot, which is called by one of the lower AD's or sometimes the first.
6. Usually the director says "cut", but camera operators may also "cut" to save film if they know the take is unusable. The operator may also call "cut" if the camera has "rolled out", i.e. run out of film. The operator will not cut if there are other cameras still rolling or an interruption would ruin the actor's focus.
7. After the director has called "cut", the first AD will check whether the director is happy with the take, and conclude the roll with a direction such as "going again" or "that's a take two" if another take is required. If the director does not want another take, the AD will call "check the gate" (a signal for the focus puller or camera assistant to confirm that the camera has not malfunctioned during a take, and that there is no hair or fluff in the aperture ("gate") where the film is exposed). When the camera has been checked, the call from the focus puller or camera assistant will be "clear gate!". Then, if that set up is complete, the AD may call "moving on" or "next set up". These announcements cue all departments and the ADs on set as to the next steps they must take. For example, "reset", "going again" and/or "back to one" may require a reset of elements in the frame extras, cars - anything that moved back to where they started, which the third AD will oversee.

The above roll sequence can be varied by, for example, eliminating the sound calls and the clapping of the slate if the shot is mute or "MOS" ("MOS" is an abbreviation of unknown origin for shooting without sound). At other times, for expediency (e.g. if the shot begins with a closeup of a closed door which then opens), the slate may be shown at the end of the take rather than the beginning. In this case, once the sound is rolling, there is an audible announcement of "End board" (also "end slate", "tails", "tail slate", or "tail sticks") so that the editing department knows to look for the sync marks at the end of the action. At the conclusion of the action, the director will still call "cut", but the first AD (and possibly others) will immediately call "end board!" or so that the camera and sound recorder are not turned off before the clapper is clapped. Also, as a visual cue to the editors, the clapper-board will be shown inverted on camera.

== Demographics ==
According to a 2019 study of the top grossing American films, the percentages of women in each job were 9% of first assistant directors, 33.6% of second assistant directors, and 31.9% of second second assistant directors.

== See also ==
- Second unit director: a director responsible for directing the second unit, often in parallel and at the same time as the main director, sometimes a specialist director with experience in a specific field e.g. car chases, fight sequences, aerial sequences etc.
