= Production schedule =

The production schedule is a project plan of how the production budget will be spent over a given timescale, for every phase of a business project.

The scheduling process starts with the script, which is analysed and broken down, scene by scene, onto a sequence of breakdown sheets, each of which records the resources required to execute the scene. These resources include:

- Cast Actors
- Special Effects
- Wardrobe
- Special Equipment
- Stunts
- Extras/Silent Bits
- Props
- Make-up/Hair
- Extras/Atmosphere
- Vehicles/Animals
- Sound Effects/Music
- Production Notes
- Others

From the breakdown sheets, the Production Manager compiles a production board which is used as the basis for a shooting schedule for every day of the shoot.

== See also ==
- Breaking down the script
