= Daily call sheet =

Document used during film production

Daily call sheet is a filmmaking term for the schedule supervised and crafted by the assistant director, using the director's shot list, the production schedule and other logistics considerations. It is issued to the cast and crew of a film production to inform them of where and when they should report for a particular day of filming, usually no later than 12 hours before the start of the next work day.

Call sheets are a vital part of video production.

The start of the day's production schedule is marked by a general and individual call times, the time when people are expected to start work on a film set.

== Information found on call sheets ==
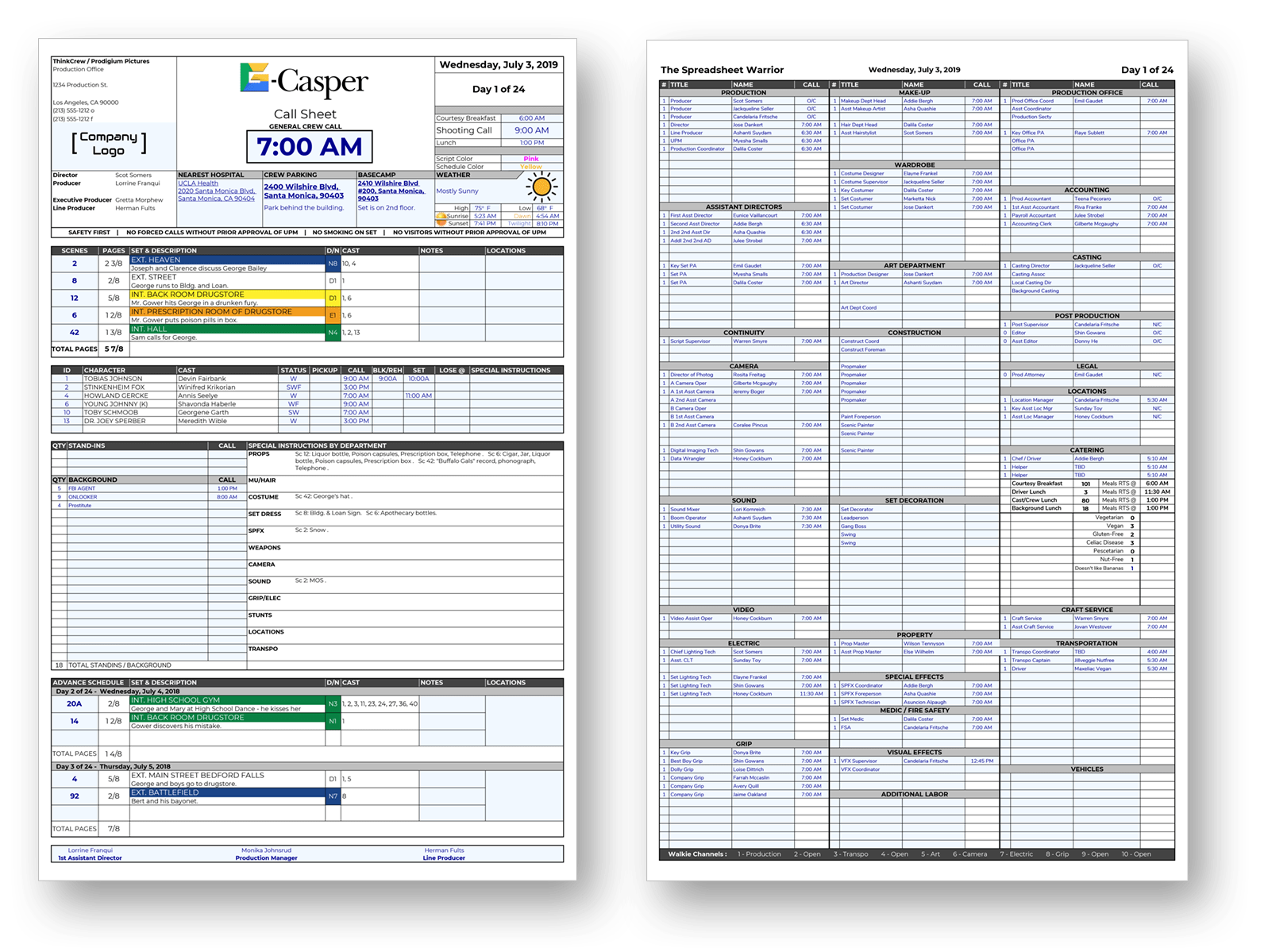
Example of a two-sided call sheet layout from the open source call sheet tool G-Casper.

Call sheets include other useful information such as contact information (e.g. phone numbers of crew members and other contacts), the schedule for the day, which scenes and script pages are being shot, and the address of the shoot location and parking arrangements. Call sheets also have information about cast transportation arrangements, parking instructions and safety notes.

A section on the front of the call sheet is usually dedicated to reminding department heads of the day's specific needs that go beyond the unit's usual tools and equipment—such as special crane rentals, special effects builds required, props and sets needing to be readied for the day and more.

Call sheets may also provide logistical information regarding the location. It is common to find such items as weather information, sunrise/sunset times, local hospitals, restaurants, dietary limitations, meal times and quantities, and hardware stores on call sheets.

Historically, call sheets were typed by typewriter (or handwritten), then copied and delivered by courier or runner. While the history of call sheets is not well documented, the oldest artifacts being sold publicly date back to as early as 1941. Modern call sheets are Excel-based and emailed as PDFs as well as printed and distributed on set. The latest generation of call sheets is cloud-based, while emailed PDFs remain as the industry norm; paper copies on set have become rarer during the COVID-19 pandemic. Call sheets adhere to the Legal paper size format, and film production departments keep them handy on set for printing on the specialized format.
