= Shooting schedule =

Film production plan

A shooting schedule is a project plan of each day's shooting for a film production. It is normally created and managed by the assistant director, who reports to the production manager managing the production schedule and production board. Both schedules represent a timeline stating where and when production resources are used.
