= Screenwriting software =

Word processors specialized to the task of writing screenplays

Screenwriting software are word processor programs specialized to the task of screenwriting and writing screenplays.

== Overview ==
=== Features ===
While add-ins and macros for word processors, such as Script Wizard for Microsoft Word, can be used to write screenplays, the need for dedicated screenwriting programs arises from the presence of certain peculiarities in standard screenplay format which are not handled well by generic word processors such as page-break constraints imposed by standard screenplay format. Screenplay software often provides specialized shortcuts for quickly typing character names or slug lines, collaborating with other writers, adding production notes, character notes, easy outlining, scene reordering, and other tools to facilitate the creative process. Other features often required when writing shooting scripts include page-locking, scene numbering, revision-tracking, and production-related reports (such as which characters appear in a given scene or which scenes are set during the day or night).

Some screenwriting applications, such as Celtx and Sophocles, also incorporate production scheduling and budgeting features.

Another class of screenwriting software includes those that, rather than act as specialized word processors, attempt to direct the writer's storytelling process by utilizing story theory to facilitate the planning of a screenplay. Examples of this type of program includes Dramatica, Cherry Draft, Scrite, and Index Card.

Screenwriting software often also provides functions that allow writers to analyze their scripts for various characteristics. In 2018, developers began adding functions that allow an analysis of gender representation such as the Bechdel test, e.g. in Highland 2, and the forthcoming Final Draft 11.

=== Platforms ===
Screenwriting programs exist for all varieties of platforms and environments including traditional standalone desktop applications that run directly on a personal computer, web applications that run solely within a browser, and mobile apps that run on phones, tablets, and other portable devices.

=== Plain text markup ===
The Fountain markup syntax, co-developed by screenwriter John August, facilitates formatting screenplays directly from plain text, be it in dedicated writing software, email programs, or text generated through OCR. There is also a formatting package for LaTeX called screenplay.

== History ==
The first screenwriting software was a standalone script formatter, Scriptor, from Screenplay Systems. It took a text file generated by a word processor and inserted the proper page break tags. When used in conjunction with a terminate-and-stay-resident program such as SmartKey or ProKey—keyboard utilities that assigned a sequence of commands to keystroke combinations—the "dot commands" that Scriptor required could be inserted semi-automatically. Additionally, keyboard macros could be programmed to properly indent and enter abbreviations—allowing a user to customize the working of the word processor.

SmartKey was popular with screenwriters from 1982 to 1987, after which word processing programs had their own macro features.

An update to Scriptor understood the style sheets used in Microsoft Word for DOS. And so the need for key macro programs was lessened. Scriptor's limitation was that once formatted it was difficult to re-import the resulting text back into a word processor for further editing.

The next generation of screenplay software hooked into Microsoft Word. Warren Script Application was initially released as a set of style sheets for Word for DOS. It was updated for Word for Windows circa 1988. gScript, a shareware script formatter/template, was released via CompuServe in 1989. It was included on the disk accompanying the book Take Word for Windows to the Edge, published by Ziff-Davis in 1993. It was subsequently updated and released commercially as ScriptWright.

This third generation of screenplay software consists of the standalone script writing programs such as Movie Magic Screenwriter, Final Draft, and Cinovation's Scriptware.

The latest generation adds online storage and collaboration and integrates with apps on mobile devices. Many software also integrate outlining tools as well as other creative support, and tools to further integrate the production process.

== See also ==
- Film production
- Project management software
