= Final Draft (software) =

Screenwriting software

- Final Draft 8 on Windows 7
- Developers: Final Draft, Inc.
- Stable release: 13.2.1 / Nov. 2024
- Operating system: macOS, Windows
- Size: 113 MB
- Available in: English
- Type: Screenwriting software
- License: Proprietary
- Website: https://www.finaldraft.com/

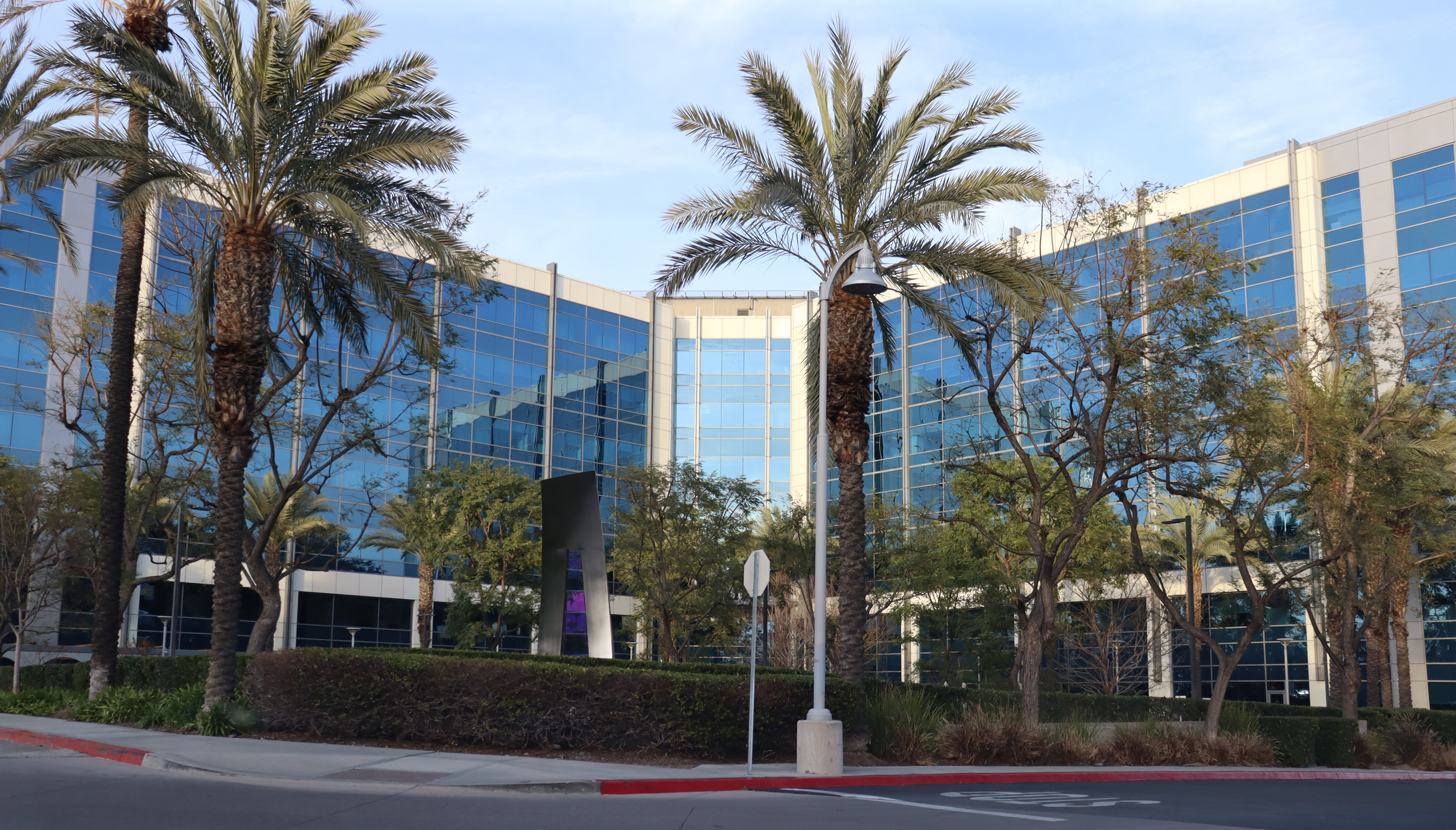
Cast & Crew Entertainment Services headquarters in Burbank, California (where Final Draft is now also based)

Final Draft is a screenwriting software program for writing and formatting screenplays.

== History ==
Final Draft was co-founded in 1990 by Marc Madnick and Ben Cahan.

In 2013, Final Draft was awarded a Primetime Emmy Engineering Award.

In 2016, Final Draft was acquired by Cast & Crew Entertainment Services.

== Usage ==
The program is a package of screenwriting word processing software for writing and formatting a screenplay to meet submission standards set by the theater, television and film industries. The program can also be used to write documents such as stageplays, outlines, treatments, query letters, novels, graphic novels, manuscripts, and basic text documents.
