= Screenplay =

Written action and dialogue for visual media

A screenplay, or script, is a written work produced for a film, television show (also known as a teleplay), or video game by screenwriters (cf. stage play). Screenplays can be original works or adaptations from existing pieces of writing. A screenplay is a form of narration in which the movements, actions, expressions and dialogue of the characters are described in a certain format. Visual or cinematographic cues may be given, as well as scene descriptions and scene changes.

== History ==
In the early silent era, before the turn of the 20th century, "scripts" for films in the United States were usually a synopsis of a film of around one paragraph and sometimes as short as one sentence. Shortly thereafter, as films grew in length and complexity, film scenarios (also called "treatments" or "synopses") were written to provide narrative coherence that had previously been improvised. Films such as A Trip to the Moon (1902) and The Great Train Robbery (1903) had scenarios consisting respectively of a list of scene headings or scene headings with a detailed explication of the action in each scene. At this time, scripts had yet to include individual shots or dialogue.

These scenario scripts evolved into continuity scripts, which listed a number of shots within each scene, thus providing continuity to streamline the filmmaking process. While some productions, notably D. W. Griffith's The Birth of a Nation (1915), were made without a script, preapproved "continuities" allowed the increasingly powerful studio executives to more accurately budget for film productions. Movie industry revolutionary Thomas H. Ince, a screenwriter himself, invented movie production by introducing an "assembly line" system of filmmaking that utilized far more detailed written materials, clearly dedicated to "separating conception from execution". Film researcher Andrew Kenneth Gay posits that, "The process of scripting for the screen did not so much emerge naturally from other literary forms such as the play script, the novel, or poetry nor to meet the artistic needs of filmmakers but developed primarily to address the manufacturing needs of industrial production."

With the advent of sound film, dialogue quickly dominated scripts, with what had been specific instructions for the filmmaker initially regressed to a list of master shots. However, screenwriters soon began to add the shot-by-shot details that characterized continuities of the films of the later silent era. Casablanca (1942), is written in this style, with detailed technical instructions interwoven with dialogue. The first use of the term "screenplay" dates to this era; the term "screen play" (two words) was used as early as 1916 in the silent era to refer to the film itself, i.e. a play shown on a screen.

With the end of the studio system in the 1950s and 1960s, these continuities were gradually split into a master-scene script, which includes all dialogue but only rudimentary scene descriptions and a shooting script devised by the director after a film is approved for production. While studio era productions required the explicit visual continuity and strict adherence to a budget that continuity scripts afforded, the master-scene script was more readable, which is of importance to an independent producer seeking financing for a project. By the production of Chinatown (1974), this change was complete. Andrew Kenneth Gay argues that this shift has raised the status of directors as auteurs and lowered the profile of screenwriters. However, he also notes that since the screenplay is no longer a technical document, screenwriting is more of a literary endeavour.

== Format and style ==
Page from a screenplay, showing dialogue and action descriptions, as well as scene cuts

The format is structured so that (as a ballpark estimate) one page equates to roughly one minute of screen time, though this often bears little resemblance to the runtime of the final production. The standard font is 12 point, 10 pitch Courier typeface. Wide margins of at least one inch are employed (usually larger for the left to accommodate hole punches). These formatting details, resulting in white space on the page, sometimes have the unintended consequence of reducing cultural specificity, which may require more detailed descriptions and thus text.

The major components are action (sometimes called "screen direction") and dialogue. The action is written in the present tense and is limited to what can be heard or seen by the audience, for example descriptions of settings, character movements, or sound effects. The dialogue is the words the characters speak, and is written in a center column.

Unique to the screenplay (as opposed to a stage play) is the use of slug lines. A slug line, also called a master scene heading, occurs at the start of each scene and typically contains three pieces of information: whether the scene is set inside or outside (INT. or EXT.; interior or exterior), the specific location, and the time of day. Each slug line begins a new scene. In a "shooting script" the slug lines are numbered consecutively for ease of reference.

=== Physical format ===
==== US ====
American screenplays are printed single-sided on three-hole-punched paper using the standard American letter size (8.5 in × 11 in; 220 mm × 280 mm). They are then held together with two brass brads in the top and bottom hole. The middle hole is left empty as it would otherwise make it harder to quickly read the script.

==== UK ====
In the United Kingdom, double-hole-punched A4 paper is normally used, which is slightly taller and narrower (210 mm × 297 mm; 8.3 in × 11.7 in) than US letter size. Some UK writers format the scripts for use in the US letter size, especially when their scripts are to be read by American producers since the pages would otherwise be cropped when printed on US paper. Because each country's standard paper size is difficult to obtain in the other country, British writers often send an electronic copy to American producers, or crop the A4 size to US letter.

A British script may be bound by a single brad at the top left-hand side of the page, making flicking through the paper easier during script meetings. Screenplays are usually bound with a light card stock cover and back page, often showing the logo of the production company or agency submitting the script, covers are there to protect the script during handling which can reduce the strength of the paper. This is especially important if the script is likely to pass through the hands of several people or through the post.

==== Other ====
Increasingly, reading copies of screenplays (that is, those distributed by producers and agencies in the hope of attracting finance or talent) are distributed printed on both sides of the paper (often professionally bound) to reduce paper waste. Occasionally they are reduced to half-size to make a small book which is convenient to read or put in a pocket; this is generally for use by the director or production crew during shooting.

Although most writing contracts continue to stipulate physical delivery of three or more copies of a finished script, it is common for scripts to be delivered electronically via email. Electronic copies allow easier copyright registration and also documenting "authorship on a given date". Authors can register works with the Writers Guild of America West (WGAW) Registry, and even television formats using the FRAPA's system.

== Screenplay formats ==
Screenplays and teleplays use a set of standardizations, beginning with proper formatting. These rules are in part to serve the practical purpose of making scripts uniformly readable blueprints of movies, and also to serve as a way of distinguishing a professional from an amateur.

=== Feature film ===
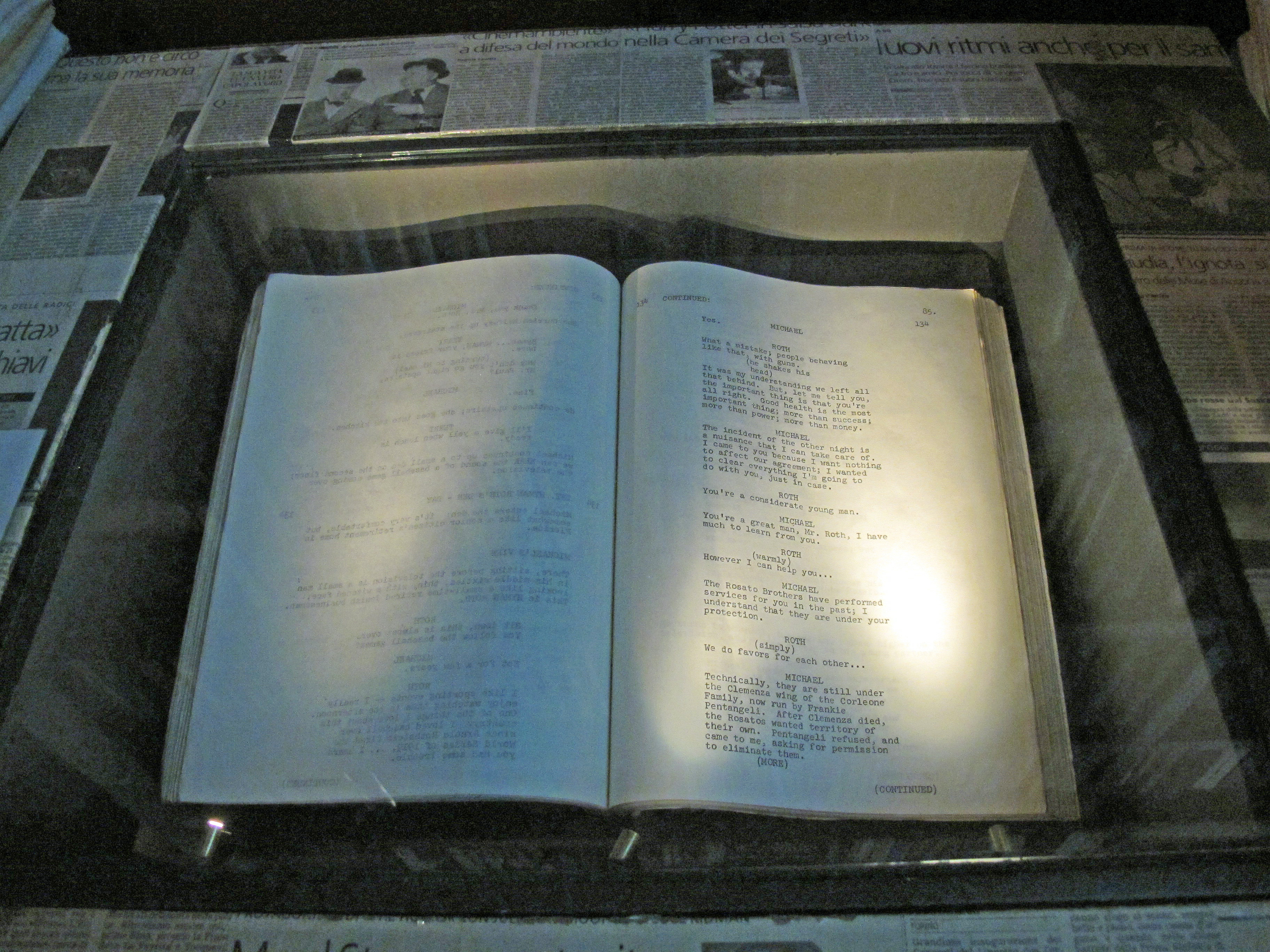
Screenplay for the 1974 film The Godfather Part II, written by Francis Ford Coppola and Mario Puzo, held at the National Museum of Cinema in Italy

Motion picture screenplays intended for submission to mainstream studios, whether in the US or elsewhere in the world, are expected to conform to a standard typographical style known widely as the studio format which stipulates how elements of the screenplay such as scene headings, action, transitions, dialogue, character names, shots and parenthetical matter should be presented on the page, as well as font size and line spacing.

One reason for this is that, when rendered in studio format, most screenplays will transfer onto the screen at the rate of approximately one page per minute. This rule of thumb is widely contested — a page of dialogue usually occupies less screen time than a page of action, for example, and it depends enormously on the literary style of the writer — and yet it continues to hold sway in modern Hollywood.

There is no single standard for studio format. Some studios have definitions of the required format written into the rubric of their writer's contract. The Nicholl Fellowship, a screenwriting competition run under the auspices of the Academy of Motion Picture Arts and Sciences, has a guide to screenplay format. A more detailed reference is The Complete Guide to Standard Script Formats.

==== Speculative screenplay ====
A speculative screenplay or "spec script" is a script written to be sold on the open market with no upfront payment, or promise of payment. The content is usually invented solely by the screenwriter, though spec screenplays can also be based on established works or real people and events.

=== Television ===
For American TV shows, the format rules for hour-long dramas and single-camera sitcoms are essentially the same as for motion pictures. The main difference is that TV scripts have act breaks. Multi-camera sitcoms use a different, specialized format that derives from stage plays and radio. In this format, dialogue is double-spaced, action lines are capitalized, and scene headings, character entrances and exits, and sound effects are capitalized and underlined.

Drama series and sitcoms are no longer the only formats that require the skills of a writer. With reality-based programming crossing genres to create various hybrid programs, many of the so-called "reality" programs are in a large part scripted in format. That is, the overall skeleton of the show and its episodes are written to dictate the content and direction of the program. The Writers Guild of America has identified this as a legitimate writer's medium, so much so that they have lobbied to impose jurisdiction over writers and producers who "format" reality-based productions. Creating reality show formats involves storytelling structure similar to screenwriting, but much more condensed and boiled down to specific plot points or actions related to the overall concept and story.

=== Documentaries ===
The script format for documentaries and audio-visual presentations which consist largely of voice-over matched to still or moving pictures is different again and uses a two-column format which can be particularly difficult to achieve in standard word processors, at least when it comes to editing or rewriting. Many script-editing software programs include templates for documentary formats.

== Screenwriting software ==
Various screenwriting software packages are available to help screenwriters adhere to the strict formatting conventions. Detailed computer programs are designed specifically to format screenplays, teleplays, and stage plays. Such packages include BPC-Screenplay, Celtx, Fade In, Final Draft, FiveSprockets, Montage, Movie Draft SE, Movie Magic Screenwriter, Movie Outline 3.0, Scrivener, and Zhura. Software is also available as web applications, accessible from any computer, and on mobile devices, such as Fade In Mobile Scripts Pro and Studio Binder, and WriterDuet, which is available as a mobile application and a website.

The first screenwriting software was SmartKey, a macro program that sent strings of commands to existing word processing programs, such as WordStar, WordPerfect and Microsoft Word. SmartKey was popular with screenwriters from 1982 to 1987, after which word processing programs had their own macro features.

== Script coverage ==
Script coverage is a filmmaking term for the analysis and grading of screenplays, often within the script-development department of a production company. While coverage may remain entirely verbal, it usually takes the form of a written report, guided by a rubric that varies from company to company. The original idea behind coverage was that a producer's assistant could read a script and then give their producer a breakdown of the project and suggest whether they should consider producing the screenplay or not.

== See also ==
- Pre-production – Phase of producing a film or television show
- Closet screenplay – Screenplay read by a person or aloud in a group rather than performed
- Dreams on Spec – Documentary film about screenwriters
- Scriptment – Screenplay-style narrative outline for a film or television project
- Film treatment – Prose summary of a planned screenplay or script
- Step outline
- Spec script – Script written without prior request
- Storyboard – Use of graphics to plan a film or story
- Outline of film – Visual art consisting of moving images
- List of screenwriting awards for film
