= Screenwriting =

Art and craft of writing screenplays

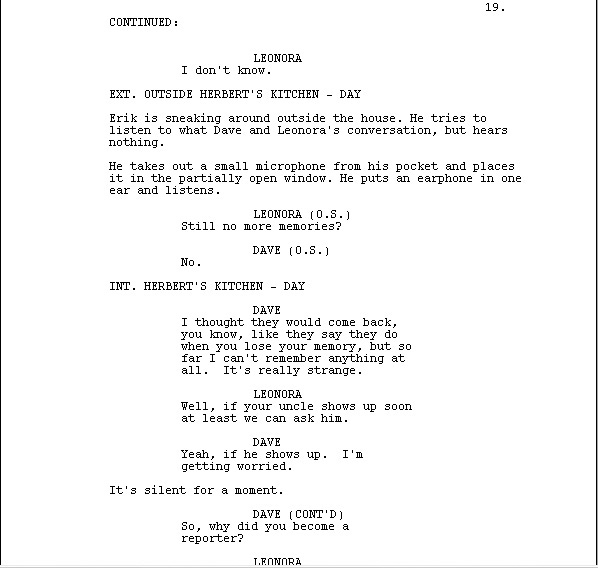
Example of a page from a screenplay formatted for a feature-length film.

Screenwriting or scriptwriting is the art and craft of writing scripts for mass media, such as feature films, television productions or video games. It is often a freelance profession.

Screenwriters are responsible for researching the story, developing the narrative, writing the script, screenplay, dialogues and delivering it, in the required format, to development executives. Screenwriters therefore have great influence over the creative direction and emotional impact of the screenplay and, arguably, of the finished film.

Screenwriters either pitch original ideas to producers, in the hope that they will be optioned or sold; or are commissioned by a producer to create a screenplay from a concept or true story, or adapt one from an existing screen work or literary work, such as a novel, poem, play, comic book, or short story.

== Types ==
The act of screenwriting takes many forms across the entertainment industry. Often, multiple writers work on the same script at different stages of development with different tasks. Over the course of a successful career, a screenwriter might be hired to write in a wide variety of roles.

Some of the most common forms of screenwriting jobs include:

=== Spec script writing ===
Spec scripts are feature film or television show scripts written without the commission of, but is on speculation of sale to a film studio, production company, or TV network. The content is usually invented solely by the screenwriter, however spec screenplays can also be based on established works or real people and events. The spec script is a Hollywood sales tool with the vast majority of scripts written each year being spec scripts, but only a small percentage make it to the screen. Although a spec script is usually a wholly original work, it can also be an adaptation.

In television writing, a spec script is a sample teleplay written to demonstrate the writer's knowledge of a show and ability to imitate its style and conventions. It is submitted to the show's producers in hopes of being hired to write future episodes of the show. Budding screenwriters attempting to break into the business generally begin by writing one or more spec scripts.

Although writing spec scripts is part of any writer's career, the Writers Guild of America forbids members to write "on speculation". The distinction is that a spec script is written as a sample independently by the writer; what is forbidden is writing a script for a specific producer without a contract. In addition to writing a script on speculation, it is generally not advised to write camera angles or other directional terminology, as these are likely to be ignored. A director may write up a shooting script themselves, a script that guides the team in what to do in order to carry out the director's vision of how the script should look. The director may ask the original writer to co-write it with them or to rewrite a script that satisfies both the director and producer of the film/TV show.

Spec writing differs from assignment writing in that the writer markets the completed script to producers. In order to sell the script, writers typically include a marketable title, polished writing, and a logline, laying out what the movie is about. A standard logline will convey the tone of the film, introduce the main character, and touch on the primary conflict. Usually the logline and title work in tandem to establish the hook, and industry standards emphasize incorporating irony into them when possible. These elements, along with clean formatting and structured prose, will impact whether a producer options a spec script.

=== Commission ===
A commissioned screenplay is written by a hired writer. The concept is usually developed long before the screenwriter is brought on, and often has multiple writers work on it before the script is given a green light. The plot development is usually based on highly successful novels, plays, TV shows, and even video games, and the rights to which have been legally acquired.

=== Feature assignment writing ===
Scripts written on assignment are screenplays created under contract with a studio, production company, or producer. These are the most common assignments sought after in screenwriting. A screenwriter can get an assignment either exclusively or from "open" assignments. A screenwriter can also be approached and offered an assignment. Assignment scripts are generally adaptations of an existing idea or property owned by the hiring company, but can also be original works based on a concept created by the writer or producer.

=== Rewriting and script doctoring ===
Most produced films are rewritten to some extent during the development process. Frequently, they are not rewritten by the original writer of the script. Many established screenwriters, as well as new writers whose work shows promise but lacks marketability, make their living rewriting scripts.

When a script's central premise or characters are good but the script is otherwise unusable, a different writer or team of writers is contracted to do an entirely new draft, often referred to as a "page one rewrite". When only small problems remain, such as bad dialogue or poor humor, a writer is hired to do a "polish" or "punch-up".

Depending on the size of the new writer's contributions, screen credit may or may not be given. For instance, in the American film industry, credit to rewriters is given only if 50% or more of the script is substantially changed. These standards can make it difficult to establish the identity and number of screenwriters who contributed to a film's creation.

When established writers are called in to rewrite portions of a script late in the development process, they are commonly referred to as script doctors. Prominent script doctors include Christopher Keane, Steve Zaillian, William Goldman, Robert Towne, Mort Nathan, Quentin Tarantino, Carrie Fisher, and Peter Russell. Many up-and-coming screenwriters work as ghostwriters.

=== Television writing ===
A freelance television writer typically uses spec scripts or previous credits and reputation to obtain a contract to write one or more episodes for an existing television show. After an episode is submitted, rewriting or polishing may be required.

A staff writer for a TV show generally works in-house, writing and rewriting episodes. Staff writers—often given other titles, such as story editor or producer—work both as a group and individually on episode scripts to maintain the show's tone, style, characters, and plots. Serialized television series will typically have a basic premise and setting that creates a story engine that can drive individual episodes, subplots, and developments.

Television show creators write the television pilot and bible of new television series. They are responsible for creating and managing all aspects of a show's characters, style, and plots. Frequently, a creator remains responsible for the show's day-to-day creative decisions throughout the series run as showrunner, head writer, or story editor.

==== Writing for daily series ====
The process of writing for soap operas and telenovelas is different from that used by prime time shows, due in part to the need to produce new episodes five days a week for several months. In one example cited by Jane Espenson, screenwriting is a "sort of three-tiered system":

a few top writers craft the overall story arcs. Mid-level writers work with them to turn those arcs into things that look a lot like traditional episode outlines, and an array of writers below that (who do not even have to be local to Los Angeles), take those outlines and quickly generate the dialogue while adhering slavishly to the outlines.

Espenson notes that a recent trend has been to eliminate the role of the mid-level writer, relying on the senior writers to do rough outlines and giving the other writers a bit more freedom. Regardless, when the finished scripts are sent to the top writers, the latter do a final round of rewrites. Espenson also notes that a show that airs daily, with characters who have decades of history behind their voices, necessitates a writing staff without the distinctive voice that can sometimes be present in prime-time series.

==== Writing for game shows ====
Game shows feature live contestants, but still use a team of writers as part of a specific format. This may involve the slate of questions and even specific phrasing or dialogue on the part of the host. Writers may not script the dialogue used by the contestants, but they work with the producers to create the actions, scenarios, and sequence of events that support the game show's concept.

=== Video game writing ===
With the continued development and increased complexity of video games, many opportunities are available to employ screenwriters in the field of video game design. Video game writers work closely with the other game designers to create characters, scenarios, and dialogue.

== Structural theories ==
Several main screenwriting theories help writers approach the screenplay by systematizing the structure, goals and techniques of writing a script. The most common kinds of theories are structural. Screenwriter William Goldman is widely quoted as saying "Screenplays are structure".

=== Three-act structure ===
According to this approach, the three acts are: the setup (of the setting, characters, and mood), the confrontation (with obstacles), and the resolution (culminating in a climax and a dénouement). In a two-hour film, the first and third acts each last about thirty minutes, with the middle act lasting about an hour, but nowadays many films begin at the confrontation point and segue immediately to the setup or begin at the resolution and return to the setup.

In Writing Drama, French writer and director Yves Lavandier shows a slightly different approach. As do most theorists, he maintains that every human action, whether fictitious or real, contains three logical parts: before the action, during the action, and after the action. But since the climax is part of the action, Lavandier maintains that the second act must include the climax, which makes for a much shorter third act than is found in most screenwriting theories.

Besides the three-act structure, it is also common to use a four- or five-act structure in a screenplay, and some screenplays may include as many as twenty separate acts.

=== The Hero's Journey ===
The hero's journey, also referred to as the monomyth, is an idea formulated by noted mythologist Joseph Campbell. The central concept of the monomyth is that a pattern can be seen in stories and myths across history. Campbell defined and explained that pattern in his book The Hero with a Thousand Faces (1949).

Campbell's insight was that important myths from around the world, which have survived for thousands of years, all share a fundamental structure. This fundamental structure contains a number of stages, which include:

1. a call to adventure, which the hero has to accept or decline,
2. a road of trials, on which the hero succeeds or fails,
3. achieving the goal (or "boon"), which often results in important self-knowledge,
4. a return to the ordinary world, which again the hero can succeed or fail, and
5. application of the boon, in which what the hero has gained can be used to improve the world.

Later, screenwriter Christopher Vogler refined and expanded the hero's journey for the screenplay form in his book, The Writer's Journey: Mythic Structure for Writers (1993).

=== Syd Field's paradigm ===
Syd Field introduced a new theory he called "the paradigm". He introduced the idea of a plot point into screenwriting theory and defined a plot point as "any incident, episode, or event that hooks into the action and spins it around in another direction". These are the anchoring pins of the story line, which hold everything in place. There are many plot points in a screenplay, but the main ones that anchor the story line in place and are the foundation of the dramatic structure, he called plot points I and II. Plot point I occurs at the end of Act 1; plot point II at the end of Act 2. Plot point I is also called the key incident because it is the true beginning of the story and, in part, what the story is about.

In a 120-page screenplay, Act 2 is about sixty pages in length, twice the length of Acts 1 and 3. Field noticed that in successful movies, an important dramatic event usually occurs at the middle of the picture, around page sixty. The action builds up to that event, and everything afterward is the result of that event. He called this event the centerpiece or midpoint. This suggested to him that the middle act is actually two acts in one. So, the three-act structure is notated 1, 2a, 2b, 3, resulting in Aristotle’s three acts being divided into four pieces of approximately thirty pages each.

Field defined two plot points near the middle of Acts 2a and 2b, called pinch I and pinch II, occurring around pages 45 and 75 of the screenplay, respectively, whose functions are to keep the action on track, moving it forward, either toward the midpoint or plot point II. Sometimes there is a relationship between pinch I and pinch II: some kind of story connection.

According to Field, the inciting incident occurs near the middle of Act 1, so-called because it sets the story into motion and is the first visual representation of the key incident. The inciting incident is also called the dramatic hook, because it leads directly to plot point I.

Field referred to a tag, an epilogue after the action in Act 3.

Here is a chronological list of the major plot points that are congruent with Field's Paradigm:

What	Characterization	Example: Star Wars: Episode IV – A New Hope
Opening image	The first image in the screenplay should summarize the entire film, especially its tone. Screenwriters often go back and redo this as their final task before submitting the script.	In outer space, near the planet Tatooine, an Imperial Star Destroyer pursues and exchanges fire with a Rebel Tantive IV spaceship.
Exposition	This provides some background information to the audience about the plot, characters' histories, setting, and theme. The status quo or ordinary world of the protagonist is established.	The settings of space and the planet Tatooine are shown; the rebellion against the Empire is described; and many of the main characters are introduced: C-3PO, R2-D2, Princess Leia Organa, Darth Vader, Luke Skywalker (the protagonist), and Ben Kenobi (Obi-Wan Kenobi). Luke's status quo is his life on his Uncle's moisture farm.
Inciting incident	Also known as the catalyst or disturbance, this is something bad, difficult, mysterious, or tragic that catalyzes the protagonist to go into motion and take action: the event that starts the protagonist on the path toward the conflict.	Luke sees the tail end of the hologram of Princess Leia, which begins a sequence of events that culminates in plot point I.
Plot point I	Also known as the first doorway of no return, or the first turning point, this is the last scene in Act 1, a surprising development that radically changes the protagonist's life, and forces him or her to confront the opponent. Once the protagonist passes through this one-way door, they cannot go back to their status quo.	This is when Luke's uncle and aunt are killed and their home is destroyed by the Empire. He has no home to go back to, so he joins the Rebels in opposing Darth Vader. Luke's goal at this point is to help the princess.
Pinch I	A reminder scene at about 3/8 of the way through the script (halfway through Act 2a) that brings up the central conflict of the drama, reminding the audience of the overall conflict.	Imperial stormtroopers attack the Millennium Falcon in Mos Eisley, reminding the audience the Empire is after the stolen Death Star plans that R2-D2 is carrying, and Luke and Ben Kenobi are trying to get to the Rebel base.
Midpoint	An important scene in the middle of the script, often a reversal of fortune or revelation that changes the direction of the story. Field suggests that driving the story toward the midpoint keeps the second act from sagging.	Luke and his companions learn that Princess Leia is aboard the Death Star. Now that Luke knows where the princess is, his new goal is to rescue her.
Pinch II	Another reminder scene about 5/8 of the way through the script (halfway through Act 2b) that is somehow linked to pinch I in reminding the audience about the central conflict.	After surviving the garbage masher, Luke and his companions clash with stormtroopers again in the Death Star while en route to the Millennium Falcon. Both scenes remind us of the Empire's opposition, and using the stormtrooper attack motif unifies both pinches.
Plot point II	A dramatic reversal that ends Act 2 and begins Act 3.	Luke, Leia, and their companions arrive at the Rebel base. Now that the princess has been successfully rescued, Luke's new goal is to assist the Rebels in attacking the Death Star.
Moment of truth	Also known as the decision point, the second doorway of no return, or the second turning point, this is the point, about midway through Act 3, when the protagonist must make a decision. The story is, in part, about what the main character decides at the moment of truth. The right choice leads to success; the wrong choice to failure.	Luke must choose between trusting his mind or trusting The Force. He makes the right choice to let go and use the Force.
Climax	The point of highest dramatic tension in the action, which immediately follows the moment of truth. The protagonist confronts the main problem of the story and either overcomes it, or comes to a tragic end.	Luke’s proton torpedoes hit the target, and he and his companions leave the Death Star.
Resolution	The issues of the story are resolved.	The Death Star explodes.
Tag	An epilogue, tying up the loose ends of the story, giving the audience closure. This is also known as denouement. Films in recent decades have had longer denouements than films made in the 1970s or earlier.	Leia awards Luke and Han medals for their heroism.

=== Kristin Thompson and David Bordwell’s Four Act Structure ===
Husband and wife film theorists David Bordwell (1947-2024) and Kristen Thompson (1950) would argue that most movies released today consist of these four acts:

- · The Set-up (which establishes a primary story situation that will lead to a formation of goals or one or more story goals)
- · Complicating Action (a “counter Set-up” that takes the action in a new direction); the
- · Development (story premises and goals have been firmly introduced and the protagonist struggles toward their goals, often with incidents and set-backs that create delays, action, suspense);
- · Climax (the final progression toward a resolution).

Both writers have provided examples of this theory in action. Thompson wrote a book in 1999 called Storytelling in the New Hollywood, where she provided 10 in-depth examples films that are told in 4 acts. She even provides an index listing movies from the 1910s to the 1990s and their use of four acts, with only a handful of movies that still use 3 (1996’s The Frighteners only has a Set-up, Development, and Climax).

On his webpage davidbordwell.net, Bordwell wrote an article called Anatomy of an Action Picture, where he discusses the four actions of 2007’s Mission Impossible III :

ACT	LENGTH	MISSION: IMPOSSIBLE III example
SET-UP	31 minutes 2 seconds	Ethan Hunt’s personal life is established and he and his team are given a story goal to save agent Lindsey Farris, whom Ethan may have approved for duty prematurely. The heroes fail at their goal and Lindsey dies.
COMPLICATING ACTION	30 minutes 31 seconds	To capture the terrorist Owen Davian, who was responsible for Lindsey’s death. Ethan and his team are planning to capture him during a deal with arms buyers at the Vatican City. They are successful in capturing him.
DEVELOPMENT	31 minutes 51 seconds	Owen is rescued from Ethan’s custody. He kidnaps Ethan’s nurse wife Julia and gives Ethan a deadline to retrieve the film’s plot McGuffin, an “end-of-the-world” device called The Rabbit’s Foot, or Davian will kill his wife. Ethan succeeds.
CLIMAX	22 minutes 23 seconds	Ethan is captured, escape, and rushes to save his wife and puts an end to the antagonist’s goals.

=== The sequence approach ===
The sequence approach to screenwriting, sometimes known as "eight-sequence structure", is a system developed by Frank Daniel, while he was the head of the Graduate Screenwriting Program at USC. It is based in part on the fact that, in the early days of cinema, technical matters forced screenwriters to divide their stories into sequences, each the length of a reel (about ten minutes).

The sequence approach mimics that early style. The story is broken up into eight 10–15 minute sequences. The sequences serve as "mini-movies", each with their own compressed three-act structure. The first two sequences combine to form the film's first act. The next four create the film's second act. The final two sequences complete the resolution and dénouement of the story. Each sequence's resolution creates the situation which sets up the next sequence.

=== Michael Welles Schock's Atoms of Storytelling ===
Shock argues that the Golden Key in structuring a film script is something he calls the “story spine.” It is the backbone of storytelling, and it starts from the beginning of the movie and continues all the way to the very end. He says that every successful story spine contains film elements

1. The Story Problem: Another word for the inciting incident. Examples given include the arrival of the terrorists in Die Hard or Nemo being kidnapped in Finding Nemo.
2. The Story Goal: the very thing that drives the main character. The MC believes that once the goal is achieved, the Story Problem will be solved and life can return to normal.
3. The Path of Action: The road the protagonist travels down to achieve the Story Goal.
4. The Main Conflict: The force of antagonism the protagonist faces. It could be human, internal, or some other external force.
5. The Stakes: The very thing that is at risk for the protagonist should they not achieve their story goal. In Die Hard, John McClane’s wife is one of the hostages in the building. If he fails, he, his wife, and the other hostages will die.

Shock says that the theory of spine could also be applied to the sequence in the Sequence approach. Each sequence spine is made up of the same five elements of the story spine.

=== Robert McKee's Story ===
Robert McKee believes that screenplays are a way to delve into a character's "life story." The structure means arranging events from a character's life story in a strategic way that elicits an emotional response from the audience or conveys a certain point-of-view in life. The events the writer chooses to incorporate into the story can not random; rather, the events included, and where they are placed in the story, must serve a purpose for the story. Story "events" impact the lives of the characters in significant ways.

== Character theories ==
=== Michael Hauge's categories ===
Michael Hauge divides primary characters into four categories. A screenplay may have more than one character in any category.

- hero: This is the main character, whose outer motivation drives the plot forward, who is the primary object of identification for the reader and audience, and who is on screen most of the time.
- nemesis: This is the character who most stands in the way of the hero achieving their outer motivation.
- reflection: This is the character who supports the hero's outer motivation or at least is in the same basic situation at the beginning of the screenplay.
- romance: This is the character who is the sexual or romantic object of at least part of the hero's outer motivation.

Secondary characters are all the other people in the screenplay and should serve as many of the functions above as possible.

Motivation is whatever the character hopes to accomplish by the end of the movie. Motivation exists on outer and inner levels.

- outer motivation is what the character visibly or physically hopes to achieve or accomplish by the end of the film. Outer motivation is revealed through action.
- inner motivation is the answer to the question, "Why does the character want to achieve their outer motivation?" This is always related to gaining greater feelings of self-worth. Since inner motivation comes from within, it is usually invisible and revealed through dialogue. Exploration of inner motivation is optional.

Motivation alone is not sufficient to make the screenplay work. There must be something preventing the hero from getting what they want. That something is conflict.

- outer conflict is whatever stands in the way of the character achieving their outer motivation. It is the sum of all the obstacles and hurdles that the character must try to overcome in order to reach their objective.
- inner conflict is whatever stands in the way of the character achieving their inner motivation. This conflict always originates from within the character and prevents him or her from achieving self-worth through inner motivation.

== Format ==
Fundamentally, the screenplay is a unique literary form. It is like a musical score, in that it is intended to be interpreted on the basis of other artists' performance, rather than serving as a finished product for the enjoyment of its audience. For this reason, a screenplay is written using technical jargon and tight, spare prose when describing stage directions. Unlike a novel or short story, a screenplay focuses on describing the literal, visual aspects of the story, rather than on the internal thoughts of its characters. In screenwriting, the aim is to evoke those thoughts and emotions through subtext, action, and symbolism.

Most modern screenplays, at least in Hollywood and related screen cultures, are written in a style known as the master-scene format or master-scene script. The format is characterized by six elements, presented in the order in which they are most likely to be used in a script:

1. Scene Heading, or Slug
2. Action Lines, or Big Print
3. Character Name
4. Parentheticals
5. Dialogue
6. Transitions

Scripts written in master-scene format are divided into scenes: "a unit of story that takes place at a specific location and time". Scene headings (or slugs) indicate the location the following scene is to take place in, whether it is interior or exterior, and the time-of-day it appears to be. Conventionally, they are capitalized, and may be underlined or bolded. In production drafts, scene headings are numbered.

Next are action lines, which describe stage direction and are generally written in the present tense with a focus only on what can be seen or heard by the audience.

Character names are in all caps, centered in the middle of the page, and indicate that a character is speaking the following dialogue. Characters who are speaking off-screen or in voice-over are indicated by the suffix (O.S.) and (V.O) respectively.

Parentheticals provide stage direction for the dialogue that follows. Most often this is to indicate how dialogue should be performed (for example, angry) but can also include small stage directions (for example, picking up vase). Overuse of parentheticals is discouraged.

Dialogue blocks are offset from the page's margin by 3.7" and are left-justified. Dialogue spoken by two characters at the same time is written side by side and is conventionally known as dual-dialogue.

The final element is the scene transition and is used to indicate how the current scene should transition into the next. It is generally assumed that the transition will be a cut, and using "CUT TO:" will be redundant. Thus the element should be used sparingly to indicate a different kind of transition such as "DISSOLVE TO:".

Screenwriting applications such as Arc Studio Pro, Final Draft (software), Celtx, Fade In (software), Slugline, Scrivener (software), and Highland, allow writers to easily format their script to adhere to the requirements of the master screen format.

== Dialogue and description ==
=== Imagery ===
Imagery can be used in many metaphoric ways. In The Talented Mr. Ripley, the title character talked of wanting to close the door on himself sometime, and then, in the end, he did. Pathetic fallacy is also frequently used; rain to express a character feeling depressed, sunny days promote a feeling of happiness and calm. Imagery can be used to sway the emotions of the audience and to clue them in to what is happening.

Imagery is well defined in City of God. The opening image sequence sets the tone for the entire film. The film opens with the shimmer of a knife's blade on a sharpening stone. A drink is being prepared, The knife's blade shows again, juxtaposed is a shot of a chicken letting loose of its harness on its feet. All symbolising 'The One that got away'. The film is about life in the favelas in Rio - sprinkled with violence and games and ambition.

=== Dialogue ===
Since the advent of sound film, or "talkies", dialogue has taken a central place in much of mainstream cinema. In the cinematic arts, the audience understands the story only through what they see and hear: action, music, sound effects, and dialogue. For many screenwriters, the only way their audiences can hear the writer's words is through the characters' dialogue. This has led writers such as Diablo Cody, Joss Whedon, and Quentin Tarantino to become well known for their dialogue—not just their stories.

Bollywood and other Indian film industries use separate dialogue writers in addition to the screenplay writers.

=== Plot ===
Plot, according to Aristotle's Poetics, refers to the sequence events connected by cause and effect in a story. A story is a series of events conveyed in chronological order. A plot is the same series of events deliberately arranged to maximize the story's dramatic, thematic, and emotional significance. E.M.Forster famously gives the example "The king died and then the queen died" is a story." But "The king died and then the queen died of grief" is a plot. For Trey Parker and Matt Stone this is best summarized as a series of events connected by either the word "therefore" or the word "however".

== Education ==
A number of American universities offer specialized Master of Fine Arts and undergraduate programs in screenwriting, including USC, DePaul University, American Film Institute, Loyola Marymount University, Chapman University, NYU, UCLA, Boston University and the University of the Arts. In Europe, the United Kingdom has an extensive range of MA and BA Screenwriting Courses including London College of Communication, Bournemouth University, Edinburgh University, and Goldsmiths College (University of London).

Some schools offer non-degree screenwriting programs, such as the TheFilmSchool, The International Film and Television School Fast Track, and the UCLA Professional / Extension Programs in Screenwriting.

New York Film Academy offers both degree and non-degree educational systems with campuses all around the world.

A variety of other educational resources for aspiring screenwriters also exist, including books, seminars, websites and podcasts, such as the Scriptnotes podcast.

== History ==
The first true screenplay is thought to be from Georges Méliès's 1902 film A Trip to the Moon. The movie is silent, but the screenplay still contains specific descriptions and action lines that resemble a modern-day script. As time went on and films became longer and more complex, the need for a screenplay became more prominent in the industry. The introduction of movie theaters also impacted the development of screenplays, as audiences became more widespread and sophisticated, so the stories had to be as well. Once the first non-silent movie was released in 1927, screenwriting became a hugely important position within Hollywood. The "studio system" of the 1930s only heightened this importance, as studio heads wanted productivity. Thus, having the "blueprint" (continuity screenplay) of the film beforehand became extremely optimal. Around 1970, the "spec script" was first created, and changed the industry for writers forever. Now, screenwriting for television (teleplays) is considered as difficult and competitive as writing is for feature films.

== Portrayed in film ==
Screenwriting has been the focus of a number of films:

- Crashing Hollywood (1931)—A screenwriter collaborates on a gangster movie with a real-life gangster. When the film is released, the mob does not like how accurate the movie is.
- Sunset Boulevard (1950)—Actor William Holden portrays a hack screenwriter forced to collaborate on a screenplay with a desperate, fading silent film star, played by Gloria Swanson.
- In a Lonely Place (1950)—Humphrey Bogart is a washed up screenwriter who gets framed for murder.
- Paris, When it Sizzles (1964)—William Holden plays a drunk screenwriter who has wasted months partying and has just two days to finish his script. He hires Audrey Hepburn to help.
- Barton Fink (1991)—John Turturro plays a naïve New York playwright who comes to Hollywood with high hopes and great ambition. While there, he meets one of his writing idols, a celebrated novelist from the past who has become a drunken hack screenwriter (a character based on William Faulkner).
- Mistress (1992)—In this comedy written by Barry Primus and J. F. Lawton, Robert Wuhl is a screenwriter/director who's got integrity, vision, and a serious script — but no career. Martin Landau is a sleazy producer who introduces Wuhl to Robert De Niro, Danny Aiello and Eli Wallach - three guys willing to invest in the movie, but with one catch: each one wants his mistress to be the star.
- The Player (1992)—In this satire of the Hollywood system, Tim Robbins plays a movie producer who thinks he's being blackmailed by a screenwriter whose script was rejected.
- Adaptation (2002)—Nicolas Cage portrays real-life screenwriter Charlie Kaufman (as well as his fictional brother, Donald) as Kaufman struggles to adapt an esoteric book (Susan Orlean’s real-life nonfiction work The Orchid Thief ) into an action-filled Hollywood screenplay.
- Dreams on Spec (2007)—The only documentary to follow aspiring screenwriters as they struggle to turn their scripts into movies, the film also features wisdom from established scribes like James L. Brooks, Nora Ephron, Carrie Fisher, and Gary Ross.
- Seven Psychopaths (2012)—In this satire, written and directed by Martin McDonagh, Colin Farrell plays a screenwriter who is struggling to finish his screenplay Seven Psychopaths, but finds unlikely inspiration after his best friend steals a Shih Tzu owned by a vicious gangster.
- Trumbo (2015)—Highly successful Hollywood screenwriter Dalton Trumbo, played in this biopic by Bryan Cranston, is targeted by the House Un-American Activities Committee for his socialist views, sent to federal prison for refusing to cooperate, and blacklisted from working in Hollywood, yet continues to write and subsequently wins two Academy Awards while using pseudonyms.

== Copyright protection ==
=== United States ===
In the United States, while completed works are eligible for copyright protection, ideas and plots are not. Any document created after 1978 is automatically copyrighted, even without formal registration or notice. However, the Library of Congress can formally register a screenplay. U.S. courts will not accept a lawsuit claiming copyright infringement until the plaintiff registers their copyright with the U.S. Copyright Office. This means that the plaintiff's efforts to address an infringement may be delayed during the registration process. Moreover, in many infringement cases, the plaintiff may not be able to recover attorney fees or collect statutory damages unless the copyright was registered before the infringement occurred. To establish proof that a screenwriter is the author of a screenplay (though not affecting the legal copyright status), the Writers Guild of America registers screenplays. Since this service is for record-keeping purposes and not legally required, various commercial and non-profit organizations also provide screenplay registration services. Additionally, protection for teleplays, formats, and screenplays can be registered with third-party vendors to offer immediate proof of authorship.

There is a line of precedent in several states (including California and New York) that allows for "idea submission" claims, based on the notion that submission of a screenplay—or even a mere pitch for one—to a studio under very particular sets of factual circumstances could potentially give rise to an implied contract to pay for the ideas embedded in that screenplay, even if an alleged derivative work does not actually infringe the screenplay author's copyright. The unfortunate side effect of such precedents (which were supposed to protect screenwriters) is that it is now that much harder to break into screenwriting. Naturally, motion picture and television production firms responded by categorically declining to read all unsolicited screenplays from unknown writers; accepting screenplays only through official channels like talent agents, managers, and attorneys; and forcing screenwriters to sign broad legal releases before their screenplays will be actually accepted, read, or considered. In turn, agents, managers, and attorneys have become extremely powerful gatekeepers on behalf of the major film studios and media networks. One symptom of how hard it is to break into screenwriting as a result of such case law is that in 2008, Universal resisted construction of a bike path along the Los Angeles River next to its studio lot because it would worsen their existing problem with desperate amateur screenwriters throwing copies of their work over the studio wall.

== See also ==
- Actantial model
- Closet screenplay
- List of film-related topics
- List of screenwriting awards for film
- Outline of film
- Prelap
- Storyboard
