= Dialect coach =

Person who trains actors to speak with authentic accents

A dialect coach is a technical advisor who supports actors as they craft voice and speech patterns for characters in the context of productions, be it in an on-camera setting (film, television and commercial), stage setting ("straight plays" as well as stand-up comedy, musicals and operas), or voiceover setting (radio plays, animation, audiobooks, video games, etc.).

Scope of work can differ widely from production to production and from actor to actor within a production. The coach's tasks may include researching real-world voices with an ear to regional, social or idiosyncratic patterns, curating primary source recordings for the actor's exploration, providing guidance and feedback during the actor's vocal design process (sometimes with input from directors or writers), running lines and monitoring vocal performance whether on set or in post (film/TV/commercials), during recording sessions (voiceovers), or at runs and previews (stage). A dialect coach will typically give notes on clarity, consistency, and credibility. Sometimes dialect elements are in place primarily to add texture to character or to the world, but occasionally authenticity is also flagged as a concern by a production. In such cases, the dialect coach will be tasked with monitoring the vocal transformation as it might be experienced by a native speaker in the audience. Above all, the coach strives to remove stumbling blocks to performance so that the actor's vocal transformation work does not distract the actor or the audience.

For on-camera productions, dialect coaches with a strong background in languages, cultures and dramatic writing may be involved in trans-creation or polishing of dialogue or other forms of written language (for signage, etc.), often with the support of native-speaker language consultants and culture advisors, including on-set language and culture monitors. Dialect coaches who have a background in linguistics may also be hired to design constructed languages (shortened to simply "conlangs").

Although the purview of the dialect coach is very different from that of the director, dialect coaches and directors often develop highly collaborative working relationships. Coaches may also be consulted by members of other departments including, for on-camera productions, writing, post, graphics, props, camera scenic and even wardrobe (for instance, when language elements appear on costumes).

Outside the acting world, dialect coaches are also employed to train broadcast journalists in speech (newscasters/newsreaders, etc.), to coach non-actor public speakers in presence and delivery, and to support singers, for instance, with diction challenges and in balancing tone and articulation in an unfamiliar language.

== Terminology ==
Throughout much of the English-speaking entertainment industry, dialect coach persists as the primary designation for a pronunciation coach. However, other designations such as speech coach are also used. In the United Kingdom, dialect coaches are also called voice coaches or accent coaches, but, in the United States, the term voice coach tends to be reserved either for those who do the work of a vocal coach, in other words, a singing coach, or who for those who coach stage actors in techniques for inducing a state of heightened relaxation prior to a rehearsal or performance. Dialect coaches often have training as voice coaches in this sense, and may offer guidance on breath support or vocal practices related to placement of resonances in the upper body, availability of expression and appropriate projection. They may also guide voice warm-ups that integrate full-body work in yoga, movement, alignment or balance. Many practitioners believe that such exercises reduce the likelihood of vocal strain, most especially during expression of high intensity emotion outdoors or in a large performing venue in the absence of electronic amplification (e.g., microphones and a PA system). There is rarely time for this type of practice on a film, television or commercial set, though dialect coaches with specialized voice training may be hired in any setting (on-screen/stage/voiceover) when vocal combat is involved.

When a production involves heightened language, for instance, with Shakespeare's works, a text coach may be consulted. Many dialect coaches also work as text coaches. In the UK, text coaching is sometimes seen as part of the job of a voice coach.

Some dialect coaches have a second specialization in as diction coaches who help opera singers with articulation of lyrics in languages relatively unfamiliar to the singer. In the past, the term diction coach was also used more generally alongside elocution coach for accent or speech coaching especially in film, though that usage varies from country to country.

A few dialect coaches have additional training as acting coaches or dialogue coaches (sometimes historically designated "dialogue directors"), but those professions are distinct from that of dialect coaching.

== Hiring and management ==
=== On-camera productions ===
On a film or television production, dialect coaches are typically hired by the line producer during pre-production to begin preparing cast far in advance of the first day of principal photography. When engaged during principal photography, it is the unit production manager, production manager, production supervisor, production coordinator or, in some cases, executive producer who is likely to recruit prospective coaches in behalf of the production. If engaged only during post-production, the coach may even be hired directly by the post producer. At any stage of the hiring process, coaches may be interviewed by the showrunner or a staff writer in the case of episodic television or by the film director in the case of a feature film. Dialect coaches may work with any members of the cast, but are brought in especially often to work with celebrity actors. Frequently, the actors or their representation will request that Production hire a specific coach.

However the coach comes to be hired, the creatives will often consult with the dialect coach early in the process in order to acquaint the dialect coach with the overall creative vision and to start the actor as early as possible to allow time for the character's voice to become fully integrated by the actor prior to the actor's first shoot day. Once hired, the coach will typically prepare actors over a number of sessions either remotely, on set, at the Production Office, in the actor's own home or, increasingly, remotely via video chat. Coaches who work in serialized television are expected to be especially flexible as there may be no opportunity for a meeting between the episode director and coach, as shooting scripts may not be finalized until very close to the day of the shoot and as last-minute casting decisions and limitations on actor-availability may make it difficult to schedule advance coaching.

During production, the key second assistant director typically coordinates coaching sessions. Many creatives will ask that the coach be present at read-throughs or story conferences, at production meetings (if serving as key coach or department head) and during at least some first-team rehearsals. After first-team rehearsal, the coach is often given the opportunity to check in with any actors they coach while the shot is set up. Often, the coach will be assigned a dressing room, or, on location, a room in the honeywagon, double-banger or triple-banger at basecamp near cast trailers. On set, the dialect coach will be issued a wireless headset and given a chair (exclusive, if on set regularly) in video village. On set, the dialect coach will be issued a wireless headset and given a chair (exclusive, if on set regularly). Many coaches, but not all, sit in video village in order to facilitate access to the director and to the script supervisor who may be asked by the coach to log notes on pronunciation and clarity, particularly if the dialogue is in dialect or language unfamiliar to the post-production team. An on-set coach may also work with an actor between takes if needed, especially on last minute changes to the script. Later, the coach may be brought back for dubbing or to pick up new lines during the post-production process, sometimes via a feed from a remote studio when the actors are no-longer available in person.

=== Stage productions ===
On a stage production, dialect coaches are typically brought in by a director or artistic director with contractual terms negotiated by a producer or general manager. Coaches work closely with the production stage manager who coordinates meetings with the director and coaching sessions for the cast collectively or individually. The coach may also be present to give notes to the actors at some rehearsals, partial runs, and full runs. Coaching typically takes place throughout the rehearsal process, but especially before the actors begin memorizing their lines and again after the show is loaded into the performance space. Understudies may be coached alongside the principal performers or after the show goes into previews. Coaching may continue in a limited way during a run.

== Status and compensation ==
In the film and television businesses, dialect coaches are very well paid. Coaches are customarily given on-screen credits for their work on films and for substantial contributions to serialized television. The wording of the credit may vary with the specific requirements of the production. Because dialect coaches are often asked to help navigate a rather unusual and sensitive set of challenges, deal memos for coaches may include terms that are not typical for crew positions, leading to the adage that dialect coaches are neither above-the-line nor below-the-line, but on-the-line.

In the Republic of Ireland, South Africa, the UK and the US, dialect coaches remain among a very small minority of production staff who are not unionized; their deals may differ in substance from production to production in these jurisdictions. In Australia and New Zealand, dialect coaches who are employed on a film or theatre set are covered under the Media, Entertainment and Arts Alliance. On English-language Canadian film and television productions, dialect coaches are unionized under the Alliance of Canadian Cinema, Television and Radio Artists, however, coaches work outside of collective bargaining agreements on French-language productions in Canada where they are not unionized under the Union des artistes.

In the theater, coaches who help actors hone dialects or character voices typically seek compensation on a par with designers and may be credited as dialect coaches, voice and speech directors or as dialect designers when the director has asked the coach to craft and coordinate a consistent vocal world across characters. Dialect coaches are not unionized for live performances in Canada, the Republic of Ireland, South Africa, the UK, or the US.

There is no membership branch of the Academy of Motion Picture Arts and Sciences that incorporates dialect coaching, nor is there a peer group of the Academy of Television Arts and Sciences that accords active membership status to coaches.

== Cost-cutting for low-budget productions ==
Due to budget constraints, producers of student films and low-budget stage plays, showcase theater and slimly financed independent films and web series may avoid hiring a dialect coach, and instead substitute the services of a low-paid or volunteer native speaker model in hopes that the actors will be able to learn mimetically, retain the accent and act in accent without expert guidance or monitoring. In some such cases, cast members may themselves pay a coach, sometimes in consultation with the director, though employing crew is not normally regarded as a cast member's responsibility. In other cases, actors may attempt to self-study the dialect using commercially available training materials or web-based voice archives which host native-speaker recordings of oral histories or interviews or other scripted speech. Many such archives also provide native-speaker recordings of phonemically balanced narrative passages, especially Comma Gets a Cure, which is structured around the lexical sets of English and other phonological patterns of potential interest to the student of dialect.

== Job prospects ==
While there are many hundreds of voice and speech trainers connected with drama courses throughout the English-speaking world who may control a stock of stage dialects for general use, far fewer specialize in dialect coaching. A web search of dialect coaches on Internet Movie Database generates a list of fewer than 100 living film and TV coaches worldwide, the majority showing few recent jobs, credited or uncredited. In some cases, a coach may moonlight as a dialect coach in film, television and commercials while pursuing an outside line of work, for instance as a resident voice and speech director for a theatre company or as a private coach for auditions, etc. As with many aspects of the entertainment business, entry into the field of dialect coaching is very competitive. Outside of the entertainment businesses based in English-speaking countries, dialect coaching is less common, and opportunities rarer.

== Professional societies ==
Dialect coaches, especially those who teach in theater education programs, may become active in such professional societies as the Australian Voice Association, the British Voice Association, the International Centre for Voice and the Voice and Speech Trainers Association.

== See also ==
- English-language accents in film
- Acting coach
