= Runaway production =

American film or television production shot outside Hollywood

- Language: English

Origin
- Origin: United States
- Meaning: filmmaking and television productions

Runaway production is a term used by the American Hollywood industry to describe filmmaking and television productions intended for initial release/exhibition or television broadcast in the U.S. that are filmed outside of the immediate Los Angeles area (including Hollywood), whether in another country, another U.S. state, or in another part of California.

In a 2005 production report by the Center for Entertainment Industry Data and Research (CEIDR), the trend of runaway productions is more frequently linked to American films and television being lured away from U.S. locations to out-of-country locations. A large reason for these productions leaving are foreign subsidies offered to American companies ultimately reducing the cost of making the film. According to the CEIDR report, "The analysis reveals that, while there are certainly general economic factors at play, such as relative labor and exchange rates, the data over the past several years strongly suggests that proliferation of production subsidies around the globe has been one of the most significant factors affecting the choice of production venues for a significant volume of production."

The report further states that "the connection between the advent of Canadian Production subsidies in late 1998 and the dramatic increase in production that occurred in the following year (as reflected by the 144% increase in dollar volume for the 2000 release year films) appears unassailable as there were no appreciable changes in exchange rates or labor rates to justify this dramatic shift from one year to the next, other than the subsidy programs".

== Hollywood ==
Los Angeles has traditionally played a large role in the history of the film industry, both in the United States and internationally. The first American film production companies emerged in New Jersey and New York. The relatively poor quality of early recording media and lighting systems meant that films had to be shot in sunlit glass studios. In turn, the unstable weather typical of the northeastern states frequently hampered production. Eventually, a trend developed towards using the western states as ideal locations for shooting.

During the early 1910s, Los Angeles was an advantageous location for filmmakers. It featured clear, dry weather that allowed them to film outdoors much of the year. Southern California also offered a broad variety of terrain. More importantly, its distance from New York City meant distance from the Motion Picture Patents Company (i.e., the Edison trust) and its patent enforcers.

Camille Johnson-Yale has argued that from a semantics perspective, the term "runaway production" (and the discourse surrounding it) arises from an implicit interpretation of Hollywood as "the authentic home to global film production, and all others as its inauthentic, even criminal, harborers." Throughout the rest of the 20th century, Hollywood remained the dominant global filmmaking center in part because the aggregate cumulative experience of its film crews made the process so much more efficient. Runaway productions have to cope with the time-consuming mistakes and inefficiencies that inevitably arise from hiring novice film crew members. For example, Rob Lowe has noted that on one film production he worked on in Atlanta, the dolly grip was having trouble hitting his marks. It was the dolly grip's first time on a set: "He'd applied for the job because he'd worked a dolly at Costco."

== Early attempts ==
Runaway production is almost as old as Hollywood itself. During the 1940s and 1950s, American studios experimented with some of the earliest forms of runaway productions in Continental Europe, where they sought to access cheap labor in economies devastated by World War II and also make use of box office revenue frozen in place by foreign exchange controls intended to protect those fragile economies.

The term "runaway" as applied to Hollywood productions shooting overseas first appeared in press coverage of union hostility to such outsourcing in Motion Picture Daily and Daily Variety in September 1949. It is unclear who coined the term and when they first started using it, but it is clear that by that point, outsourcing was already "creating enough anxiety among unions that they needed an expression to anchor a campaign to fight the phenomenon".

An additional incentive for Hollywood to go abroad accidentally arose in 1951, when Congress amended Section 116 of the Internal Revenue Code to exempt money earned abroad from income tax as long as the taxpayer resided abroad for 17 out of 18 months. This was originally intended to benefit American construction and petroleum engineers, and then American movie stars discovered Section 116 could help them escape the high income taxes then in effect in the United States. Congress later capped the Section 116 exemption, but not before "numerous films" were made overseas during the 1950s which would not otherwise exist.

However, Hollywood soon discovered that a major limitation on outsourcing productions overseas was the language barrier, in an era when fluency in the English language was far less widespread than it would become by the end of the 20th century and machine translation had not yet been invented. American directors found themselves struggling to effectively manage film crews who did not speak English. Managing through interpreters was slow and expensive. Important nuances were constantly lost in translation. All the documents necessary to make a movie had to be translated, not just the screenplay. Hollywood studios also discovered that travel and accommodation costs for above-the-line American workers often outweighed any savings from hiring below-the-line local personnel. Some American producers spent too freely while working far from home with frozen funds and local subsidies, and ended up losing money. Despite these problems, runaway productions filmed in Europe were still viable into the mid-1960s because the late arrival of commercial broadcasting in Europe meant that the loss of cinema attendance to television was also late to occur there. Hollywood studios continued to film in Europe to make their products more attractive to the "foreign market".

Since the 1970s, the runaway production phenomenon has continued to be driven by tax policy, but its effect is increasingly concentrated on the film finance side, rather than movie stars' interest in limiting their liability for personal income tax. The first "significant example" of this occurred in the United Kingdom in the early 1980s: the "sale and leaseback" arrangement in which a studio or producer would sell a film to a group of British investors, then lease back the film for 15 years at a below-market interest rate. However, this was shut down by Inland Revenue in 1985.

== The race to the bottom ==
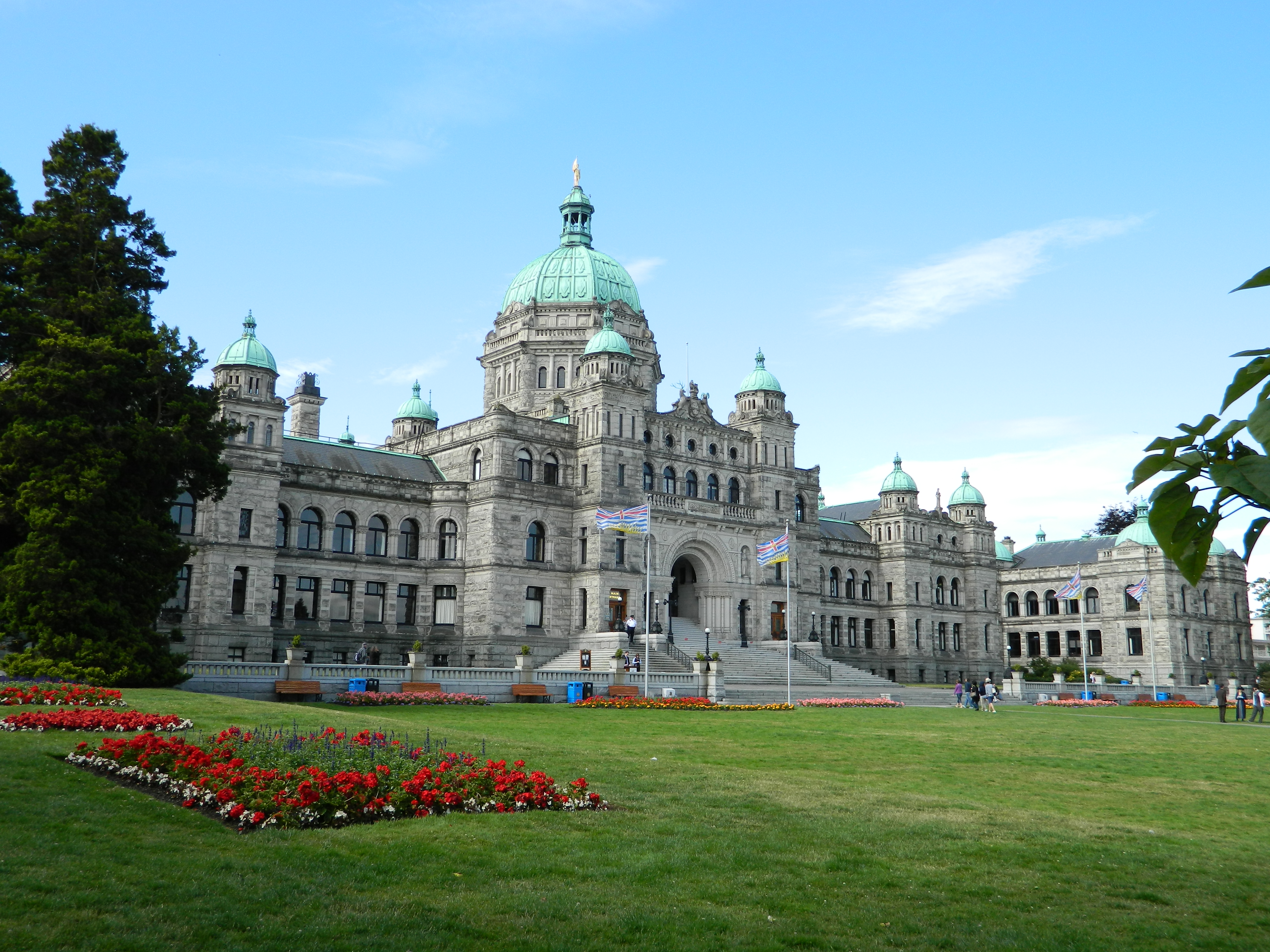
The Parliament Buildings, home of the Legislative Assembly of British Columbia

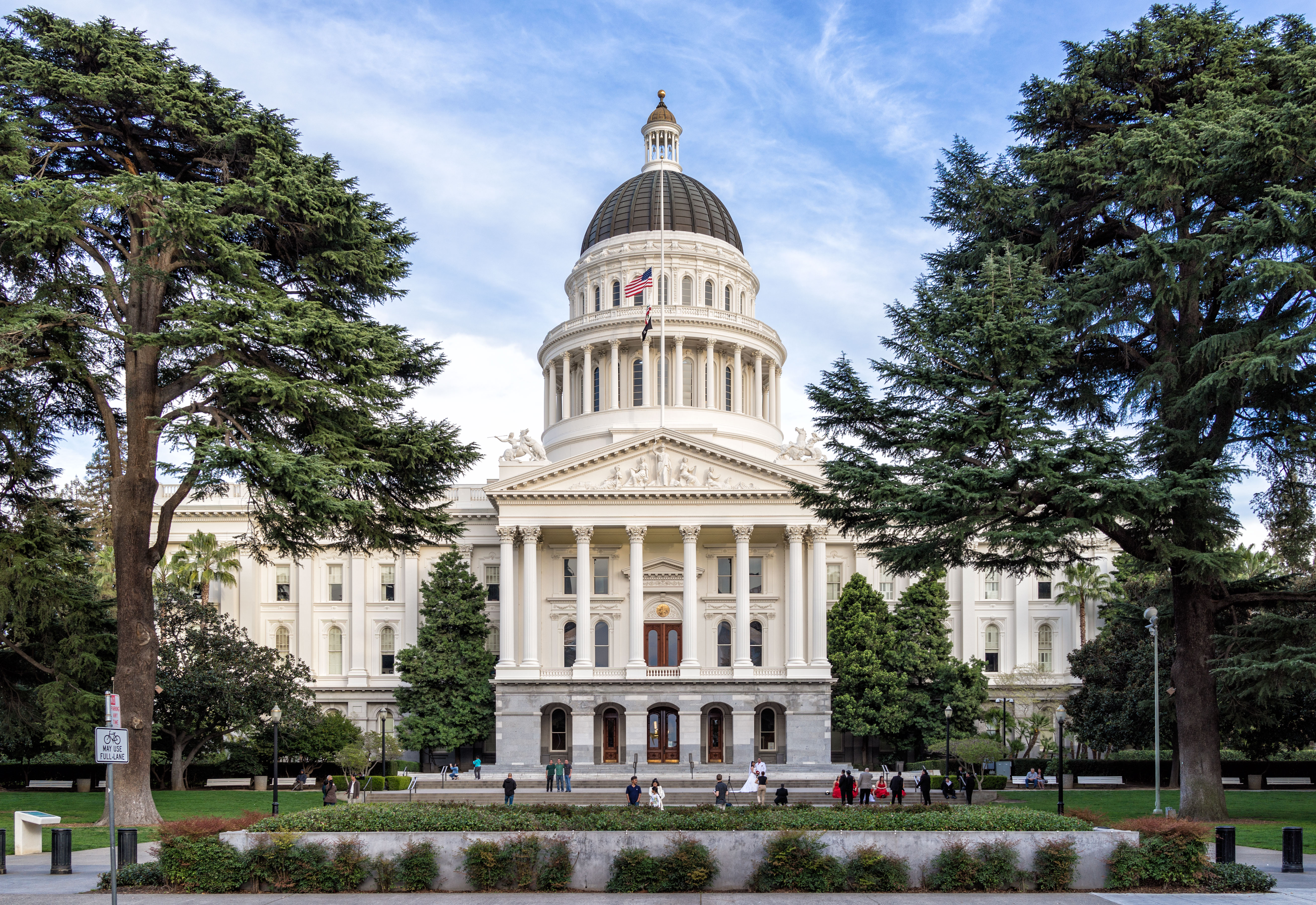
The California State Capitol, home of the California State Legislature

Since the 1990s, the legislatures of British Columbia and California have faced off in a race to the bottom.

To undercut Hollywood's traditional advantage of having more experienced and competent crew members than anywhere else, other jurisdictions starting with British Columbia in the 1990s began to offer generous tax incentives to attract American film and television productions. By the 2010s, British Columbia's innovations had resulted in a wild "race to the bottom" around the world, in terms of how jurisdictions were competing to hand out subsidies in the form of tax deductions or tax credits (as distinguished from the traditional policy of imposing full taxation on film and television work like any other kind of work). On the one hand, bringing film and television work to one's home jurisdiction is a quick way for politicians to create a lot of jobs, because shooting on location can happen much faster than building a factory. On the other hand, those jobs are temporary and transient, and they will readily flee to the next jurisdiction willing to offer more.

Hollywood-based cast and crew traditionally prefer to film close to home when possible, but that is no longer financially feasible for most projects. During its many decades of prosperity in the late 20th century, California implemented some of the strongest labor protections in the world, while failing to recognize that it was now in direct competition against numerous jurisdictions who were offering "shockingly generous" tax incentives on top of other advantages like lower costs of living and less stringent labor protections. In other words, competing jurisdictions' film crews may be inexperienced, incompetent, and inefficient, but they are cheaper and can be forced to work longer hours in more arduous conditions, and their home governments will handsomely reward American producers and directors for their patience. As long as the director can coax at least one good shot per scene out of a locally hired crew, the audience will never know or care about all the bloopers left on the cutting room floor. Thus, filming in California in the 21st century often means that a film or television project is more likely to lose money or barely break even, while filming in another state or country in exchange for a tax credit greatly increases the chance that a project will be profitable. Filmmakers often find that balancing production budgets in California means trimming down production values or reducing the number of shooting days, while projects shot elsewhere can splurge on more lavish sets, costumes, and special effects, as well as longer shooting schedules.

By 2025, the cost of filming in California was so high relative to other jurisdictions that it was cheaper to fly Rob Lowe all the way to Dublin, Ireland and back to host the game show The Floor, along with 100 American contestants, than to simply film the show in California. About that, Lowe said: "It’s criminal what California and L.A. have let happen — it’s criminal. Everybody should be fired.'"

A side effect of outsourcing film and television work is that fewer apprenticeships are available to the next generation of California filmmakers. This is slowly eroding the concentration of experience and know-how which had made Hollywood unique. As show business jobs continued to evaporate steadily during the 2020s, Los Angeles was widely seen at risk of becoming the next Detroit. The January 2025 wildfires pushed many filmmaking professionals to their breaking point. Financially, it made more sense for many of them to move to the places where their jobs had gone, than to try to stay and rebuild.

From a legal and financial perspective, American film and television executives have no choice but to focus on short-term profits over the long-term interests of the American entertainment industry as a whole. Most executives with greenlight power are part of publicly traded media conglomerates whose corporate directors have a fiduciary duty to the shareholders to earn a profit, and that duty has crushed any sentimental attachment to the tradition of shooting films in Hollywood.

== "Creative" and "economic" runaways ==
A report commissioned by the Directors Guild of America (DGA) defined two classes of runaway productions. "Creative runaways" are film and television projects that are produced, in part or in whole, outside the United States based on requirements of the script, setting, or due to preferences of the actors or director. Alternatively, "economic runaways" are productions made in other countries to "reduce costs." This type of production typically involves films that are set (written to be shot) in the United States but which instead have been outsourced to other countries such as Canada, Australia, Fiji, Germany, Hungary, Ireland, New Zealand, South Africa, or the United Kingdom.

Since economic runaways can be caused by a variety of factors, more recent scholarly research has further refined the definition. In general, there are three different categories of runaway productions (1) artificial economic runaways,(2) natural economic runaways, and (3) artistic runaways. Artificial economic runaways are films shot abroad or in another domestic locale or jurisdiction because of artificial, or legislatively created, incentives designed to lure productions. Natural economic runaways are films that shoot in a location to take advantage of natural economic occurring phenomenon—like cheap labor—that lower production costs. Artistic runaways are films that shoot abroad to artistically service the story – a film about Paris that shoots in Paris.

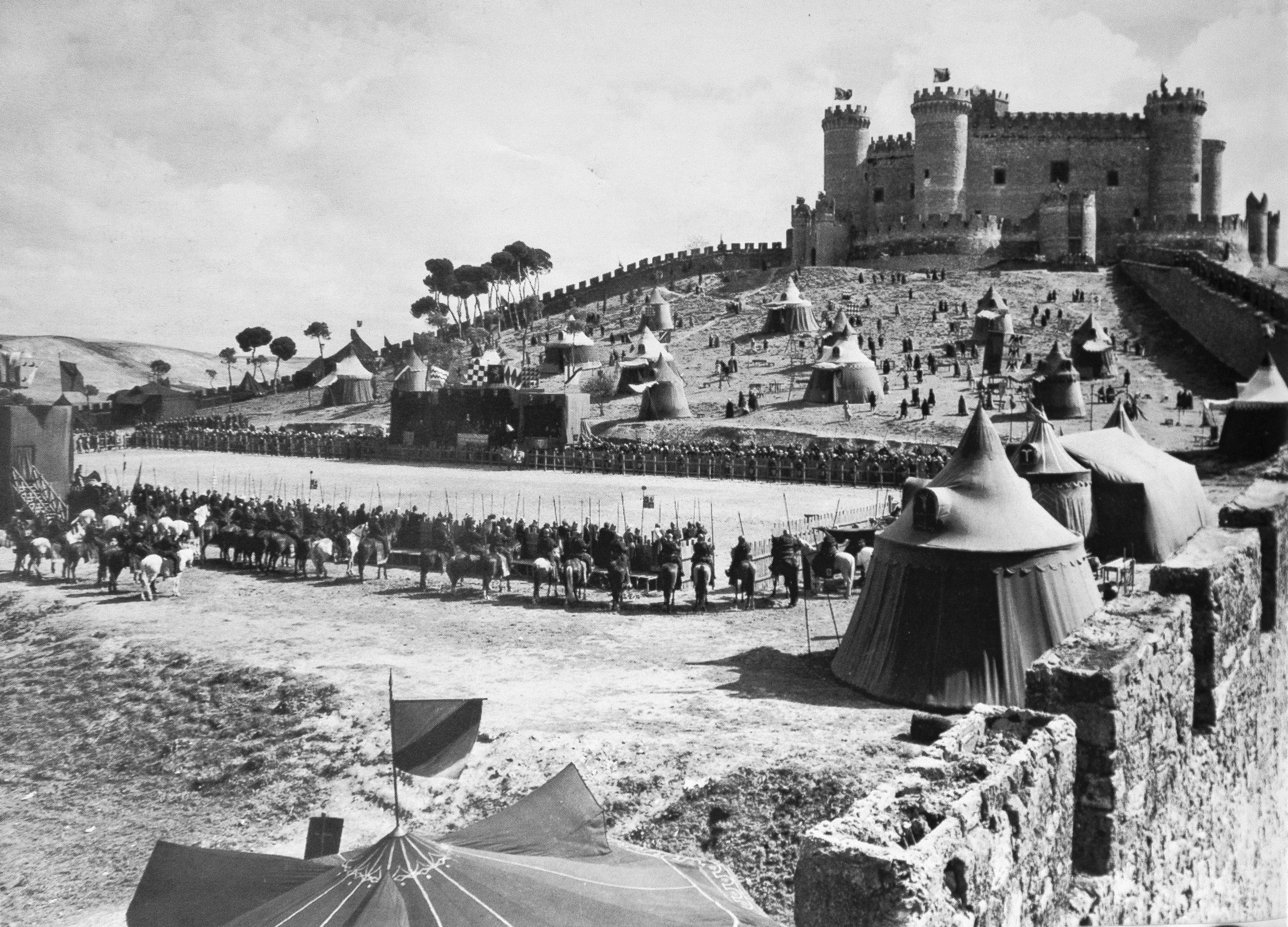
A mass scene during the shooting of El Cid in the 1950s at the Castle of Belmonte, Spain

Motives may be mixed: for example, Francoist Spain kept foreign exchange controls from the Spanish Civil War to the 1970s. Filming in Spain was the only way for American producers to indirectly recover the box-office profits from local cinemas exhibiting American films. Cheap labor, increasingly skilled crews, and varied landscapes also contributed to bring to Spanish locations super-productions such as Alexander the Great (1956), The Pride and the Passion (1957), Solomon and Sheba (1959). Producer Samuel Bronston established himself in Spain to link American producers and Spanish talent and authorities. Patton (1970) also benefited from Spanish soldiers playing Americans and Germans in battle scenes and from utilizing World War II equipment made available by the Spanish army.

According to CEIDR, Canada receives 90% of U.S. runaway productions, and offers the bulk of the government subsidies. A subsidy is defined as financial contributions or kickbacks where "government revenue that is otherwise due is foregone or not collected", according to GATT – General Agreement on Tariffs and Trade.

== Effect of Canadian subsidies on employment in the US ==
According to a 2001 U.S. Department of Commerce report by Commerce Secretary Norman Mineta, "Runaway film production' has affected thousands of (U.S.) workers in industries ranging from computer graphic to construction workers and caterers. These losses threaten to disrupt important parts of a vital American industry."

The U.S. film industry has voiced concerns about this outsourcing trend which began in the mid to late 1990s, and which coincided with increased Canadian government subsidy programs.

A DGA-funded study confirmed that the Canadian government has engaged in a comprehensive and aggressive, long-term strategic campaign to lure U.S. productions to Canada. The report estimates that runaway productions cost the United States over 50,000 jobs and at least US$10 billion in production monies annually.

At least $13 billion is doled out annually in corporate welfare to the business sector in combined Canadian federal and provincial subsidies and tax breaks, according to the Canadian Taxpayers Federation (CTF), a conservative tax watchdog. The CTF released a report saying that from 1982 to 1997, the Canadian federal government handed out $11 billion in 32,969 grants and loans to the provinces earmarked as business subsidies or directly to corporations.

== Measuring employment in the U.S. motion picture industry ==
In 1992, the MPAA claimed 164,000 Californians were directly employed in entertainment production, rising to 226,000 in 1996. Furthermore, in 1996, the estimated number of California jobs indirectly generated by the entertainment industry ranged from 233,000 to 253,100, which brought the "industry's total employment to well over 450,000." The MPAA claimed that entertainment production in California during 1996 generated $27.5 billion in economic activity for the state. The astonishing economic growth from 1992 to 1996, according to the MPAA, exploded for two reasons: (1) as the growth of multiplex theaters and cable television rose, it created a higher general demand for more entertainment media productions; and (2) "the possibility that this new production activity would occur outside California, or in other countries, did not materialize."

In 2004, the MPAA reported employment numbers for the entire United States. The employment numbers were broken into three categories: production and services (P&S), theaters and video tape rental, and other. In 1995, the total number of Americans employed in the motion picture industry was 283,700 (135,200 in P&S); in 1997, total employment was 323,000 (159,600 P&S); in 2000, total employment was 351,600 (182,100 P&S) and; in 2004, total employment was 367,900 (198,300 P&S). Hence, in 1997, according to the MPAA 2004 report, total U.S. motion picture employment of 323,000 represents a huge discrepancy from the MPAA's earlier claim that, in 1996, the industry employed over 450,000 workers in California alone. Adding to the confusion, The Commerce Report—which used the same BLS data cited by the MPAA—claimed 236,152 workers were employed nationwide in motion picture production and allied services in 1997.

In August 2005, the Los Angeles Economic Development Corporation (LAEDC) released a report commissioned by the California Film Commission on the economic impact of runaway productions. The report compared motion picture employment numbers gathered from the MPAA and the United States Census for the same year, 2002. The data from the MPAA and the Census was divided into two categories: (1) overall motion picture employment in the United States and; (2) the amount of motion picture employment in California—how much California captures of the total U.S. figure. In 2002, the Census reported that 153,000 people worked in the motion picture industry in the United States and, of that amount, 88,500 worked in California. The MPAA data for 2002 reported 353,076 workers in the motion picture industry in the United States, with 245,900 of those jobs in California.

The MPAA, in 1996, claimed that the film industry employed 750,000 Americans, a number that remained on the MPAA's Web Site in 2008.

== Competing subsidies ==
"Who is representing the interests of taxpayers here?" asked CTF Saskatchewan director David MacLean. "The film industry is playing the Saskatchewan government like a worn-out movie script, drawing them into bidding war with other provinces. It's a race to the bottom where nobody wins except film producers."

When faced with the prospect of a worldwide subsidy war, Ron Haney, executive director of the Directors Guild of Canada is quoted as saying, "Everybody can compete with tax credits now ... It's absolutely frightening."

According to a study by the Canadian government, productions are beginning to "run away" from Canada as well. Productions are now going to countries that have introduced competing and/or counter-incentives and/or subsidies. Many productions are starting to return to the United States due to recent legislation to counteract runaway production.

While film and television employment attributed to foreign location spending and actual spending levels by such productions increased in 2008, the state film incentives enacted in U.S. states showed clear increases in the number of productions shooting in the respective enacting U.S. jurisdiction.

Several Canadian companies are also pulling their support for Canadian Television Fund (CTF) because, "(It) was never intended as a permanent source of funding" to subsidize broadcasters and programmers. One Canadian company stated that, "Our understanding was that after the initial five-year period, the fund would be self-sustaining and self-financing from a return on investment in successful productions."

"The Vancouver Sun's Michael McCullough points out that California not only has the world's highest production costs it also has no tax credits. How do they do it? That's the question BC's film industry should be asking, rather than looking to taxpayers to buck up ... The tit for tat tax credit game is one with only one loser, the taxpayer. There will always be other jurisdictions that will out-subsidize BC. Louisiana offers a straight 20% subsidy for production costs, is that the next industry demand? It is not the job of the government to keep up with incentives but the industry's role to remain competitive."

== Other U.S. attempts to end runaway production ==
The movement of industry jobs to other jurisdictions has led to the formation of non-profit U.S. industry groups, such as the Film and Television Action Committee (FTAC) as well as other groups such as the Directors Guild of America (DGA), SAG-AFTRA (which absorbed the Screen Actors Guild) and others, who have been lobbying state and federal governments to introduce American legislation and counter-incentive programs. Several studies have concluded that foreign government subsidies for film and television production put American film industry workers and companies at an extreme disadvantage.

FTAC believes that foreign government subsidies such as those Canada uses to support its film industry labor are in violation of the WTO rules restricting or prohibiting the use of government subsidies to prop up previously undeveloped industries (such as the Canadian film industry). On September 4, 2007, the FTAC filed a Section 301 complaint with the United States Trade Representative (USTR). In the petition, the FTAC argued subsidies offered by Canada to lure production and filming of U.S.-produced television shows and motion pictures were inconsistent with Canada's obligations under the WTO. Six weeks later, October 19, 2007, the USTR rejected FTAC's petition. In a press release, the USTR's office stated:

"As provided under USTR regulations, the petition was reviewed by an interagency committee of trade and economic experts. Based on a thorough review of the economic data, other facts, and legal arguments set out in the petition, the interagency committee unanimously recommended that the USTR not accept the petition because a dispute based on the information and arguments set out in the petition would not be effective in addressing the Canadian subsidies."

== Countervailing efforts in the United States ==
In recent years, some members of the United States Congress have attempted to counter the runaway production situation with counter-incentives.

The American Jobs Creation Act of 2004 contained provisions allowing U.S. producers of films with budgets under $15 million ($20 million if shot in a low-income neighborhood) to immediately write off their costs in a single year (if 75% of their principal costs are incurred via shooting in the U.S.) It also allows producers to be taxed at a capital gains rate of 15% (rather than at the higher 35% personal income tax rate). Previously producers had to amortize those costs over several years.

Local and state governments have also implemented counter-incentive programs in an effort to encourage domestic film productions to remain in the United States, and the federal government has proposed legislation to rein in outsourcing and prevent what some legislators describe as unfair foreign competition.

== See also ==
- Branch plant economy
- Cinema of Canada
- Cinema of the United States
- List of movie-related topics
- Movie production incentives in the United States
- Offshoring
