= Robert Latham Brown =

American film producer

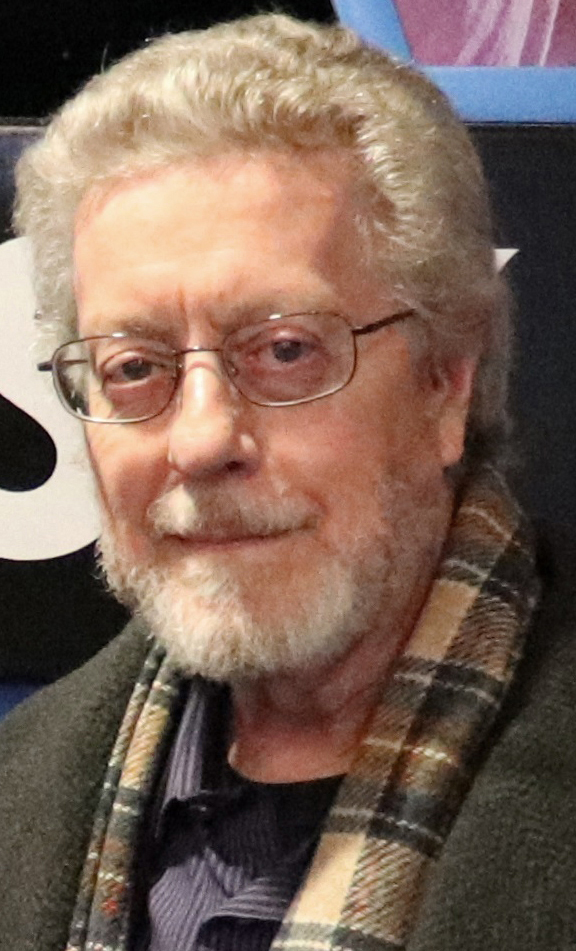
- Robert Brown - Rise of Skywalker 2019
- Born: Alexandria, Virginia, U.S.
- Occupations: Film producer, line producer, author, USC film and television adjunct professor
- Years active: 1979–present

Robert Latham Brown (born June 20, 1947) is a film producer, line producer, production manager, author, and University of Southern California film and television adjunct professor. In his more than 30-year film career Brown has worked with George Lucas, Paul Verhoeven, Steven Spielberg, and others. His expertise in budgeting and line producing inspired Mel Brooks, his multi-feature boss at the time, to nickname Brown "Mr. On-Budget".

== Career ==
Robert Latham Brown has worked in production capacity on more than 40 feature films, including the very small (the Ray Liotta/Ron Perlman film Local Color, along with drama The Anarchist Cookbook) and also the very large (Blues Brothers, Starship Troopers, and the Kevin Bacon film Hollow Man).

Robert Latham Brown spent most of his early career at Universal Studios. After his work with John Carpenter on The Thing, the invitation of Lucasfilm producer/vice president Howard Kazanjian sent Brown to begin work on Return of the Jedi. Afterward Brown's career took a freelance aspect that allowed him to work on an eclectic list of films with some of the top individuals in the business, including Michael Douglas, Harrison Ford, and Samuel L. Jackson.

=== Author and teacher ===
Robert Latham Brown authored the long acclaimed book Planning the Low-Budget Film, and has been an adjunct professor at the University of Southern California School of Cinematic Arts since 1996. Additionally, Brown is a former contributing writer to Indie Slate Magazine, writing a series of reviews on film production software.

=== Writing awards ===
Brown's book, Planning the Low-Budget Film was a finalist for the 2007 Benjamin Franklin Awards, and that same year was a first-place winner in the Hollywood Book Festival. In 2002, his screenplay Keats was named a semi-finalist in the 9th Annual Writer's Network Screenplay and Fiction Competition. In 2020, his screenplay Xena & Jonny was named a finalist in the ScreenCraft Family Screenplay Competition.

== Partial filmography ==
Year	Film	Credit	Notes
1979	The Concorde ... Airport '79	Unit Production Manager	Credited as "Bob Brown."
1980	The Nude Bomb	Unit Production Manager	
1980	The Blues Brothers	Unit Production Manager	
1981	All Night Long	Unit Production Manager	
1981	Bustin' Loose	Unit Production Manager	
1981	Ghost Story	Production Manager	
1982	The Thing	Production Manager	Shot in the U.S. and Canada.
1983	Return of the Jedi	Production Executive	U.S. filming.
1983	Iceman	Production Manager	Shot in the U.S. and Canada.
1983	Indiana Jones and the Temple of Doom	Production Manager	U.S. filming.
1983	Best Defense	Unit Production Manager	Shot in the U.S. and Israel.
1984	The Goonies	Unit Production Manager	Second unit, uncredited.
1985	Warning Sign	Associate Producer; Unit Production Manager	
1986	Blue City	Unit Production Manager	
1986	One Crazy Summer	Unit Production Manager	
1986	Howard the Duck	Co-Producer; Production Manager	
1987	Spaceballs	Production Manager	
1988	Clean and Sober	Unit Production Manager	
1988	Elvira, Mistress of the Dark	Production Manager	Additional scenes.
1988	Child's Play	Unit Production Manager	
1989	The War of the Roses	Unit Production Manager	
1990	Child's Play 2	Executive Producer	
1991	Child's Play 3	Producer	
1993	Babylon 5: The Gathering	Producer	Pilot telefilm
1993	Robin Hood: Men in Tights	Executive in Charge of Production; Production Manager	
1995	Dracula: Dead and Loving It	Associate Producer; Production Manager	
1995	Showgirls	Unit Production Manager	
1997	Starship Troopers	Production Manager	
1998	The Parent Trap	Unit Production Manager	
2000	Hollow Man	Production Manager	
2001	Ali	Production Manager	Uncredited. Prep period only.
2002	Spider-Man	Unit Production Manager	Additional scenes and post production. Uncredited.
2002	Vampires: Los Muertos	Line Producer; Unit Production Manager	U.S. filming.
2002	The Anarchist Cookbook	Producer	
2003	Charlie's Angels: Full Throttle	Unit Production Manager	Additional scenes. Uncredited.
2003	S.W.A.T.	Unit Production Manager	
2005	A Lot Like Love	Unit Production Manager	
2005	Lords of Dogtown	Unit Production Manager	Additional scenes. Uncredited.
2006	Local Color	Co-producer; Unit Production Manager	
2006	The Holiday	Unit Production Manager	Additional scenes. Uncredited.
2009	Hard Breakers	Producer; Production Manager	
