= The Anarchist Cookbook (film) =

The Cookbook
- DVD cover
- Directed by: Jordan Susman
- Written by: Jordan Susman
- Produced by: Jordan Susman; Robert Latham Brown; Amy Greenspun
- Starring: Devon Gummersall; Dylan Bruno; Gina Philips; Johnny Whitworth; Katharine Towne; Steve Van Wormer; John Savage
- Cinematography: Brown Cooper
- Edited by: Alan Edward Bell
- Music by: Josh Kramon
- Production companies: Freedonia Productions; MPS Studios Dallas
- Distributed by: Innovation Film Group
- Release dates: June 1, 2002 (Seattle); July 18, 2003
- Running time: 102 minutes
- Country: United States
- Language: English
- Budget: $2 million
- Box office: $14,369

The Anarchist Cookbook is a 2002 American romantic comedy-drama film written and directed by Jordan Susman. The film follows a young honors student-turned-anarchist, Puck, and his group of anarchist friends living peacefully in a Dallas commune until a nihilist, Johnny Black, appears with a copy of The Anarchist Cookbook and completely destroys their way of life.

== Plot ==
=== Puck's introduction ===
The story is narrated by the protagonist, Puck, who opens with a monologue describing the basic reasoning underlying his philosophy, as well as the film's general interpretation of Anarchism, as he walks through the commune he lives in, while events of his daily life are presented.

Other members of the commune include Johnny Red, a 1960s radical who constantly refers to Sweden as an ideal society; Gin, Red's hippie girlfriend; Karla, a bisexual with issues of misandry; Sweeney, a promiscuous DJ who worked at a local record store; Double D, an unintelligent but goodhearted commune member, and Puck's best friend; and "The Trolls", a ragtag group of "crunchy types" who lived in tents in the backyard of the house and home schooled about a dozen children. The commune, referred to as "Sam", is funded by a collective Anarchist bookstore, where the members take turns operating the front desk. Throughout the film, this group is referred to as "The Family", and their way of life is described as peaceful and happy, until the day Johnny Black, a mysterious, militant nihilist with a forceful personality, appears.

Johnny Black shares much of the rebellious philosophy of "The Family" when he shows up; however, he disrespects what he sees as the narrow-minded and shortsighted protest tactics Johnny Red espouses. However, politically weak within the framework of the Family, Black cannot challenge Red's authority for the time being.

Frustrated and unhappy with his social life and lack of direction, Puck seeks a girlfriend. He eventually meets a young woman at a night club, Jody, who he learns is a young Republican college student. However, when his new observations of Jody's political beliefs and academic success causes him greater internal conflict and personal embarrassment, Puck decides to temporarily leave the Family and ventures out to find a new job and home. Still unhappy and directionless, Puck opts to return to the Family.

=== The rise of Johnny Black ===
In the time that has transpired in Puck's absence, Black's influence over the family has steadily grown. Encouraging the group to forge alliances with "like-minded" organizations, over time, Black undergoes a more militant shift in personality. At a meeting for a planned protest demonstration against a petrochemical plant, Black denounces the peaceful, non-violent approach most of the attendants support, and presents two tools to be used in their attack on the plant: semtex and The Anarchist Cookbook.

Johnny Red describes the book as "a relic from the past... it taught you how to make bombs, how to make drugs... and it meant something once." He also accurately mentions that the author, William Powell, has disavowed the book. He continues, commenting, "the book's not the problem. The problem is the kind of people who look to it for answers."

A few days afterward, Johnny Black discovers Red's private journal, in which he admits to being sexually attracted to young boys. He places this in the open for Gin to discover, and after reading a passage in which Red admits to his pedophilia, she dumps him. Following this, Red's personality becomes more anxious and submissive to Black.

One day, while carrying science kits, Puck, Double D, and Sweeney are approached by a police officer who randomly stops them and requests to inspect their contents. After complying, they receive a ride from the officer to Sam, explaining that their run down house is in fact an orphanage the kits are intended for. The officer decides to visit the building, and enters to discover Karla in the midst of using cocaine with Johnny Black. The entire group, except for Johnny Red, is promptly arrested and brought to trial, the presiding judge ironically being a spurned, former lover of Karla. The flop house, Sam, is shut down by the city; Johnny Black receives time at a medium security prison, with the possibility for parole in four months; Sweeney and Double D each receive 250 hours of community service; Karla, aside from being insulted by the judge, is made to receive a mandatory psychiatric evaluation; and Puck is placed under house arrest for 180 days, and forced to move into his parents' home in the city of Plano, Texas. Puck chafes in his suburban life, but comes to accept it with Jody's encouragement, until Johnny Black is paroled after four months. Black appears in Puck's apartment and easily convinces Puck to remove the ankle bracelet that tracks him and rejoin the Family.

=== Escalation and Puck's resolution ===
Puck soon discovers that Karla, Sweeney, and Double D are all suffering from drug addiction, and have relocated to a new squat which they name "Son of Sam". The next stage of Johnny Black's strategy for his movement is the creation of a coalition of organizations which agree with any facet of his goals. However, these include extremist groups, such as neo-nazis and militia men.

Black offers The Anarchist Cookbook as an instructional booklet to the other groups, while they pledge to offer various arms and explosives, and plans a "joint mission" to attack a local university. Puck attempts to leave the organization, but is under constant surveillance. He commits to remaining in the group, so as to watch over Double D, for whom he feels responsible. This situation eventually ends in tragedy when Double D overdoses on diazepam. Puck finally resolves to escape from the group and prevent the mission, and convinces a sober Sweeney and Johnny Red to help. Together, they devise a plan to intoxicate the extremist group members with pancakes laced with the very drugs Double D overdosed on.

Once the entire organization is unconscious, the surviving members of the Family split up. Alone, Puck decides that once the group awakens he would be in immediate danger, and so decides to report the organization and cooperate fully with the FBI, for which he receives a reward of $200,000. Immediately afterward, Puck considers his options and realizing that he now has the money and time to commit to his future, decides to take Jody's advice and return to college. Alone, he begins to hitchhike to California to join Jody as she interns at the Ronald Reagan Presidential Library. Receiving a ride from a truck driver, Puck is asked what his name is, and after some internal thinking, decides to accept his legal name and chosen name together: "Peter Puck". The final monologue by Puck meditates over his new perspective on life and his personal philosophy, and renounces the concept of "freedom without responsibility", which contrasts with his idealistic opening-sequence monologue.

== Cast ==
- Devon Gummersall as Peter Leslie "Puck" Gold
- Dylan Bruno as Johnny Black
- Gina Philips as Karla
- Johnny Whitworth as Sweeney
- Katharine Towne as Jody
- Steve Van Wormer as David "Double D" Dwight
- John Savage as Johnny Red
- Sabine Singh as Gin
- Bo Barron as Cool Teen
- Jordan Wall as Straight-Laced Teenager
- Gail Cronauer as Woman In Book Store

== Production ==
The film's budget and schedule are used extensively (and reproduced) in Robert Latham Brown's book Planning the Low-Budget Film. It was shot in Dallas, Texas, during the summer of 2001 for just under $2 million.

In an interview, director Jordan Susman commented that inspirations for the film included "Animal House, Battle of Algiers, and Duck Soup... Everywhere Chico and Harpo Marx went, anarchy ensued. When they spread their anarchy, it was the most joyous thing you had ever seen. I made (lead actor Devon Gummersall) watch Duck Soup, and he saw what I wanted to show, which was a sense of personal freedom and autonomy."

== Release ==
=== Box office ===
Released in a limited release on July 18, 2003, The Anarchist Cookbook was a box office failure, grossing $8,251 in its opening weekend, only playing in two theaters. The final domestic gross is $14,369.

=== Critical reception ===
The film was received with generally negative criticism. Review aggregator website Rotten Tomatoes shows a freshness rating of 39%, and Metacritic's average review score is 36 out of 100.

The film was also heavily criticized by anarchists, who charged that, aside from its poor cinematic qualities, it presented caricatures of anarchist characters and philosophy, which amounted to anti-anarchist propaganda. Negative reviews for the film appeared in anarchist publications, including a scathing review in Anarchy: A Journal of Desire Armed, by Lawrence Jarach:

Despite the title and the pretensions of the characters' self-images, the plain fact is that there are no anarchists in this film... This film could have been funny if there weren't so many stupid prejudices about anarchism/anarchists in it. It could have been mildly entertaining if there had been even one sympathetic character in it. It could have been provocative if there had been even one remotely intelligent discussion of anarchism anywhere in it. But this stupid video can't be used to point out anything worthwhile--politically or cinematically.

Green Anarchy magazine also published a review of the film with a similar critique:

The Anarchist Cookbook paints a cartoon-like picture of a so-called "anarchist" scene in Dallas, Texas. To be blunt, there are no anarchists in the film... To put it simply, this film is a pathetic stereotype of anarchists, meant to make us look stupid. While there are some very embarrassing people in the anarchist "movement", this is absurd... It's only worth mentioning because it is out in the mainstream, and promotes a misconception we'll have to deal with. As stereotypes go, I would much prefer the armchair intellectual or bearded bomb-thrower to that of Beavis and Butthead.
