= Wolfgang Bauer (Austrian writer) =

Austrian writer (1941–2005)

- Born: 18 March 1941; Graz, Styria, Nazi Germany
- Died: 26 August 2005 (aged 64); Graz, Styria, Austria
- Occupations: Writer, playwright
- Writing career
- Notable awards: List of decorations and awards

Wolfgang Bauer (18 March 1941 – 26 August 2005) was an Austrian writer best known as a playwright who, particularly in his younger days, was regarded as an enfant terrible by the Austrian cultural establishment.

== Life and career ==
Bauer was born in Graz, Styria. His breakthrough play was Magic Afternoon in 1967, in which he portrays four youths who interrupt their lazy and boring afternoon by unmotivated outbreaks of violence and aggression (Magic Afternoon was adapted for the screen most recently by Catherine Jelski in 2000 as The Young Unknowns). After two more successes, Change (1969) and Gespenster (Ghosts, 1973), Bauer's plays became increasingly surreal and experimental. Bauer though resisted any labelling by academia and critics alike until his death. Most of his plays during 1967 and 1990 were translated into English by Martin Esslin, remembered for coining the term Theatre of the Absurd. In the late 1970s and early 1980s, San Francisco's Magic Theatre performed a play of Bauer's almost every season. In 1993, his play Tadpoletigermosquitos at Mulligan's was premiered at New York's Ohio Theatre.

Wolfgang Bauer was a heavy smoker and drinker. After a series of cardiac operations, he died in his native Graz of heart failure. His friend, the composer Kurt Schwertsik wrote Ein Kleines Requiem partly for him.

== Works ==
Bauer's plays have been translated into 24 languages and have been performed in 35 countries. This is a complete list of his published works in German:

=== Plays ===
- Der Schweinetransport (1961)
- Maler und Farbe (1961)
- Batyscaphe 17-26 oder Die Hölle ist oben (1961)
- Totu-wa-botu (1961)
- Zwei Fliegen auf einem Gleis (1962)
- Katharina Doppelkopf (1962)
- Der Rüssel (1962)
- Mikrodramen (1962/63, 21 very short "unplayable plays", engl. title: Microdramas)
- Pfnacht (1963)
- Die Menschenfresser (1963)
- Party for Six (1964)
- Ende sogar noch besser als alles gut! (1965)
- Der Tod des Ingenieurs Leo Habernik aus Linz (1965)
- Magic Afternoon (1967)
- Change (1968/69)
- Film und Frau (1971, engl. title: "Shakespeare the Sadist")
- Silvester oder Das Massaker im Hotel Sacher (1971)
- Gespenster (1973, engl. title: Ghosts)
- Magnetküsse (1975, engl. title: Magnetic Kisses)
- Memory Hotel (1979/80, UA + ED 1980)
- Woher kommen wir? Was sind wir? Wohin gehen wir? (1981, engl. title: Singapore Sling)
- Das kurze Leben der Schneewolken (1982)
- Ein fröhlicher Morgen beim Friseur (1982, engl. title: A Wonderful Day at the Barbershop))
- Ein schrecklicher Traum (1986, an adaption of Shakespeare's A Midsummernight's Dream)
- Herr Faust spielt Roulette (1986)
- Das Lächeln des Brian dePalma (1988)
- Ach, armer Orpheus! (1989)
- Insalata mista (1992, engl. title: Tadpoltigermosquitos at Mulligan's)
- Die Kantine. Cappricio à la Habsburg. (1993)
- Die Menschenfabrik (1996)
- Skizzenbuch (1996)
- Café Tamagotchi (1998)
- Foyer (2004)

=== Libretti ===
- Magnet (1978)
- Café Museum - Die Erleuchtung. (1993)
- Das gestohlene Herz (2004)

=== Novel ===
- Der Fieberkopf (1967, engl. The Feverhead)

=== Poems ===
- Das stille Schilf. Ein schlechtes Meisterwerk: schlechte Texte mit schlechten Zeichnungen und einer schlechten Schallplatte. (1969)
- Das Herz (1981)

=== Radio Plays ===
- Zisterne (1961)
- Die Entfernung (1972, alt. title: 1431)
- Dream Jockey (1998)

=== Screenplays ===
- Die Edeggerfamilie (1970)
- Häuptling der Alpen (1974)
- Es war nicht die Nachtigall (1974)
- Reise zum Gehirn (1975, adaption of Bauers novel Der Fieberkopf (The Feverhead))
- In Zeiten wie diesen (1983)
- 22, schwarz... (1987)
- Der Weihnachtstraum (1994)

=== Works in English translation ===
- Change, and Other Plays (includes Magic Afternoon, Change, and Party for Six), translated by Martin Esslin and Renata Esslin. New York: Hill & Wang, 1973. ISBN 978-0-8090-0750-9
- The Feverhead (original title: Der Fieberkopf, 1967), translated by Malcolm Green. London: Atlas Press, 1993. ISBN 978-0-947757-65-6
- Wolfgang Bauer: Selected Works (includes Bathyscaphe 16–27 or Hell is Above, Microdramas, Pfnacht, Herr Faust Plays Roulette, The People Factory, Sketchbook, The Dream Jockey, and Café Tamagotchi), translated by Luke Schumacher. Kitchener-Waterloo: Editions Cox, 2025. ISBN 978-3-9826294-1-4

=== In anthologies ===
- "Insalata Mista" (staged in English as Tadpoletigermosquitos at Mulligan's), in Seven Contemporary Austrian Plays, edited by Richard H. Lawson. Riverside, CA: Ariadne Press, 1995. ISBN 978-1-57241-017-6

== Decorations and awards ==
- Peter Rosegger prize (1970 and 2004)
- Franz Theodor Csokor Award (1970)
- Austrian Prize for Literature (1979)
- Manuscripts Award (1987)
- Kainz Medal (1989)
- Golden Medal of Honour of Graz (1991)
- Honorary Medal of Vienna in Gold (1991)
- Drama prize of the Goethe Institute (1994)
- Grand Austrian State Prize for Literature (1994; presented on 20 April 1995)
- Austrian Cross of Honour for Science and Art, 1st class (2000)
- Styrian cultural award (2004)
