= Henner Hofmann =

Mexican cinematographer (1950–2026)

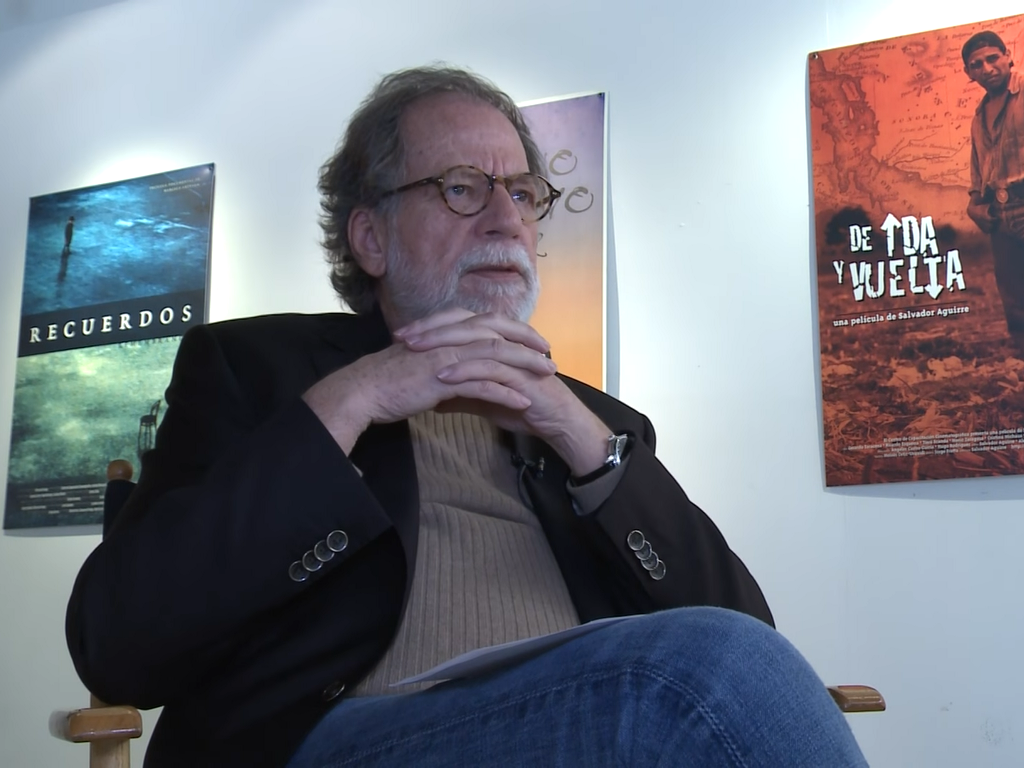
- Born: Henner H. Hofmann; July 1950; Mexico City, Mexico
- Died: 30 January 2026 (aged 75); Cuernavaca, Morelos, Mexico
- Education: National Autonomous University of Mexico
- Occupations: Cinematographer; film producer
- Years active: 1970–2026
- Organization(s): Mexican Society of Cinematographers; American Society of Cinematographers
- Awards: Ariel Award for Best Cinematography; 1991 The Legend of the Mask; 1995 Juego Limpio

Henner Hofmann, AMC, ASC (July 1950 – 30 January 2026) was a Mexican cinematographer and film producer.

== Early life ==
Hofmann was born in Mexico City, Mexico in July 1950. Both of his parents were artists. His father, Herbert Hofmann Isenburg, was a sculptor who was born in Frankfurt, Germany. He studied at the Bauhaus and later in Paris in the workshop of the French sculptor Aristide Maillol, and arrived in Mexico in 1939. His mother, Kitzia Hofmann, created stained glass art for churches in Mexico and the United States. Hofmann once said that one of the films that had a strong impression on him was the short film The Red Balloon (1956) shot by Edmond Séchan. He said, "It is a magical story of a boy and a balloon that is full of charm and strong emotional undercurrents. That film left a mark on me forever. I was 7, and I remember every shot".

At the age of 18, Hofmann attended the Centro Universitario de Estudios Cinematográficos, CUEC, at the National Autonomous University of Mexico. The Circus, a documentary presented as his thesis, was distinguished with an honorable mention in Warsaw, Poland.

== Career ==
In 1977, Henner Hofmann, Afonso Muñoz, Gonzalo Martínez Ortega, Ignacio Nacho López, Óscar Menéndez and Juan Rulfo founded the Archives of Ethnic Communities, with more than 45 documentaries about the indigenous communities in Mexico. Hofmann began his career as a cinematographer after four years of traveling throughout Mexico, resulting in his first film, Bajo el Mismo Sol.

Hofmann was the first Mexican cinematographer to win a Coral Award for best photography in the Havana Film Festival. He won an Ariel Award, Mexico's most prestigious award in the film industry, for his cinematography in José Buil's The Legend of the Mask (1991). In 1992, Hofmann founded the Mexican Society of Cinematographers (AMC) and was president from 1992 to 2004.

He was a member of the Technicians and Cinematographic Production Guild, the Mexican Academy of Arts and Cinematographic Science, and the Screen Writers' Guild in Mexico City. In the U.S. he was a member of the American Society of Cinematographers (ASC), the International Cinematographers Guild, IATSE Local 600, and a member of the Academy of Motion Picture Arts and Sciences.

Hofmann worked as a teacher in film schools in Mexico City. From 2008 to 2016, he was the headmaster at the Centro de Capacitación Cinematográfica film school.

== Filmography ==
=== Film ===
Year	Title	Director	Notes
1979	Bajo el mismo sol y sobre la misma tierra	Federico Weingartshofer	1st of two collaborations with Weingartshofer
1980	La madrugada	Ludwik Margules	
1980	Cuando la niebla levante	Federico Weingartshofer	
1982	Confidencias	Jaime Humberto Hermosillo	
1987	Pasa en las mejores familias	Julián Pastor	1st of four collaborations with Pastor
1987	Macho y hembras	Julián Pastor	
1987	Los fantasmas que aman demasiado	Julián Pastor	
1989	Giron de niebla	Carlos Enrique Taboada	
1990	Las buenas costumbres	Julián Pastor	
1991	The Legend of the Mask	José Buil	1st Ariel Award win
1991	Lucrecia	Bosco Arochi	
1992	Cándido de día, Pérez de noche	Jorge Ortiz de Pinedo	
1992	Nocturno a Rosario	Matilde Landeta	
1992	El corrido de los Perez	Hernando Name	
1993	Old Shoes	Sergio Andrade	
1994	Immortal Combat	Dan Neira	
1995	Jonah and the Pink Whale	Juan Carlos Valdivia	
1995	Juego limpio	Marco Julio Linares	2nd Ariel Award win
1998	Ground Control	Richard Howard	
1999	Ave María	Eduardo Rossoff	
2000	Flight of Fancy	Noel Quiñones	
2000	Compassionate Sex	Laura Mañá	
2000	Time of Her Time	Francis Delia	
2002	Vampires: Los Muertos	Tommy Lee Wallace	
2008	Moe	José Luis Valenzuela	
2012	Gallowwalkers	Andrew Goth	
