= Arly Jover =

Spanish actress

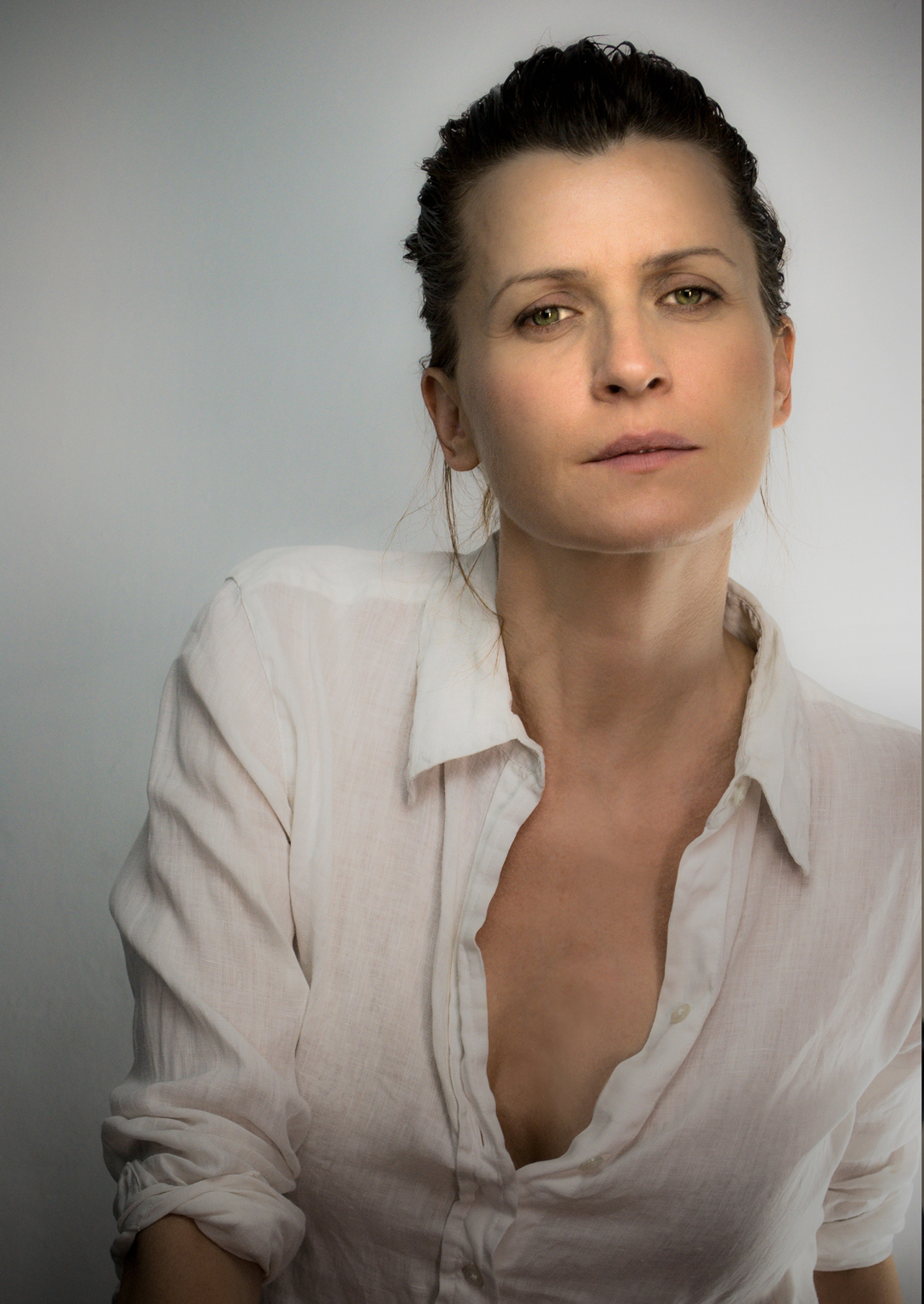
- Photo of Jover taken by Blake Worrell, date unknown.
- Born: Melilla, Spain
- Occupation: Actress
- Years active: 1994–present
- Children: 1

Araceli "Arly" Jover is a Spanish actress. She is best known for her role as the villainous vampire Mercury in the 1998 superhero film Blade.

== Life and career ==
Araceli Jover was born in Melilla, Spain. After living there for five years, her family was moved to Mallorca, in the Balearic Islands (Spain) because of her father's work as a soldier. She is the youngest of four sisters and three brothers.

During her early years, she wanted to become a dancer. She began dancing at the age of 8. At 14, she dropped out of school, and at 15, she won a scholarship from the Comité Hispano Norteamericano. Because of this, she left Spain and moved to New York City in order to continue to study at the School of American Ballet under Martha Graham. After two and a half years in the United States, her career then moved on to acting sometime around 1995–1996. She had her first role in an episode of the television show Women: Stories of Passion and starred in two international films Tango, and The Ballad of Johnny-Jane. After that, she did more work in television, before making her first American film debut in Blade, in 1998, as Mercury, the vampire lover of Deacon Frost.

In the following years, she starred in various small roles in films and TV episodes, as well as larger roles in other films such as Fish in a Barrel, and Vampires: Los Muertos. After 18 years in the United States, she then moved to France. Shortly after arriving there, she got a major role in the film Empire of the Wolves alongside Jean Reno.

== Filmography ==
=== Film ===
Year	Title	Role	Notes
1994	Tango		
1995	The Ballad of Johnny-Jane		
1998	Blade	Mercury	
2000	Everything Put Together	Nurse Edna	
2000	The Young Unknowns	Paloma	
2000	Four Dogs Playing Poker	Maria	
2001	Fish in a Barrel	Nina	
2001	Imposter	Newscaster #2	
2002	Vampires: Los Muertos	Una	
2003	April's Shower	Sophie	
2005	Empire of the Wolves	Anna Heymes	
2006	Madame Irma	Ines	
2007	Two Worlds	Delphine	
2008	Le voyage aux Pyrénées	Aline	
2008	Little Ashes	Gala Dalí	UK-Spanish production
2009	Regrets	Lisa	
2009	Magma	Ainhoa Javier	
2010	The White Line	Alice	
2010	Gigola	Johanne	
2010	Qui a envie d'être aimé?	Claire	
2011	The Minister	Séverine Saint-Jean	
2011	The Girl with the Dragon Tattoo	Liv	
2012	Quand je serai petit	Ana	
2012	Haute Cuisine	La journaliste Mary	
2012	The Lookout	Kathy	
2013	Turning Tide	Anna Bruckner	Original title: En solitaire
2015	The Idealist	Estibaliz	
2015	2 Nights Till Morning	Céline	
2016	A Prominent Patient	Marcia Davenport	Czech: Masaryk
2017	Axolotl Overkill	Alice	
2025	In the Lost Lands	Ash	

=== Television ===
Year	Title	Role	Notes
1996	Women: Stories of Passion	Pascal	Episode: "City of Men"
1998	Players	Kiva	2 episodes
2003	Dragnet	Katrina Fluery	Episode: "The Artful Dodger"
2006	This Girl Is Mine	Johana Iglesias	TV film
2009	Vénus & Apollon	Jo - l'amie d'Angie	Episode #2.5
2013	Mon ami Pierrot	Cécilia	TV film
2013	Les Petits Meurtres D'Agatha Christie	Alma Sarrazin	Episode: "Pourquoi pas Martin?"
2015	Eyes Open	Hélène	TV film
2015	Captain Alatriste	Madame de Brissac	11 episodes
2015	Malaterra	Adriana Agnese	8 episodes
2015	Magnum Opus	Irune Gormendia	4 episodes
2018	Sense8	Georges	Episode: "Amor Vincit Omnia"

=== Music video ===
- "Walking After You", Foo Fighters (1998) — Female love interest
