= Devon Gummersall =

American actor

- Born: Devon Ryan Gummersall; Durango, Colorado, U.S.
- Occupations: Actor, Director, Writer
- Years active: 1992–present

Devon Gummersall is an American actor, writer, and television and film director best known for his role as Brian Krakow on ABC's My So-Called Life, for which he was nominated for two Young Artist Awards.

== Life and career ==
Gummersall was born in Durango, Colorado, the son of visual artist C. Gregory Gummersall. He has lived in Los Angeles since the age of 10 and began acting at the age of 13. His first major performance was as a guest star on the television series Dream On. In 1994, when he was 15-year-old, he was cast as Brian Krakow in the highly acclaimed ABC series My So-Called Life. He was nominated for two Young Artist Awards. For his role of nerd, neighbor with long-ish curly hair, he was nominated for two Young Artist Awards, for Best Performance by a Youth Ensemble in a Television Series and for Best Performance by a Youth Actor in a Drama Series.

He also played Zach during the first season of the hit show Felicity. He was cast in the television series The Fugitive in 2000. Gummersall also played Sean de Luca in the TV show Roswell and starred opposite Lili Taylor in the Lifetime series State of Mind (2006) and has continued to appear in independent films such as The Anarchist Cookbook and Tripping Tommy (2010). He also appeared on Private Practice, Drop Dead Diva, The Gates, The Mentalist, Criminal Minds.

He played Peggy Olson's easy-going date, Stevie, on Mad Men. His appearance on the show caused significant online reaction on Twitter.

Gummersall was cast in WGN America's Underground as a series regular, playing an abolitionist named John Hawkes. He was replaced by Marc Blucas before the straight-to-series drama started production.

He played Jacob Barnes on TNT action-drama The Last Ship, and patient's dad Larry Edwards on The Pitt.

=== Writing and directing ===
He directed two episodes of Nashville. He has penned several episodes of Marshall Herskovitz and Ed Zwick's web/NBC series quarterlife. He filmed, edited, and directed the music documentary Lawn Chairs and Living Rooms and directed the award-winning short films Bullies On Vacation and PORK...a short film. He wrote and directed the indie feature Low Fidelity (released by Amplify in 2013) and directed his second feature in 2014, the indie thriller The Inherited, starring Nathan Darrow and Annabella Sciorra. In addition to his film work, Gummersall co-founded the LA-based theater ensemble The Piece Project and directed the West Coast premiere of Bekah Brunstetter’s Drunk for the IAMA theater company. He was a member of the 2014-2016 ABC/Disney/DGA Director Program.

== Personal life ==
Gummersall was married to actress Majandra Delfino for one year between 2007 and 2008.

== Filmography ==
=== Actor ===
- Blossom (1993, TV series) – Jimmy
- My So-Called Life (1994–1995, TV series) – Brian Krakow
- From the Mixed-Up Files of Mrs. Basil E. Frankweiler (1995, TV movie) – Steve
- The Price of Love (1995, TV movie) – T. J.
- It's My Party (1996) – Andrew Bingham
- Educating Mom (1996, TV movie) – Dwayne
- Independence Day (1996) – Philip
- Relativity (1996, TV series) – Jake Roth
- After Jimmy (1996, TV movie) – Bailey
- Do Me A Favor (1997) – Lincoln Muller
- Wind River (1998) – Sylvester
- When Trumpets Fade (1998, TV movie) – Lonnie
- Felicity (1998, TV series) – Zach
- Student Affairs (1999, TV movie) – Eddie
- Lured Innocence (1999) – Elden Tolbert
- Little Savant (1999) – Chooch
- Dick (1999) – Larry Jobs
- Men Named Milo, Women Named Greta (2000) – Richmond
- The Young Unknowns (2000) – Charlie
- The Fugitive (2000, TV series) – Chuck Brixius
- Earth vs. the Spider (2001, TV movie) – Quentin Kemmer
- Seven and a Match (2001) – Matthew
- Homeward Bound (2002, TV movie) – Tom
- Roswell (2002, TV series) – Sean de Luca
- The Anarchist Cookbook (2002) – Puck
- Never Get Outta the Boat (2002) – Julian
- Tru Calling (2003, TV series) – Kevin Rafferty
- The L Word (2004, TV series) – Lisa
- Dead & Breakfast (2004) – Orange Cap
- McBride: The Chameleon Murder (2005, TV movie) – Dudley
- Reeker (2005) – Jack
- 24 (2007, TV series) – Mark Hauser
- State of Mind (2007, TV series) – Barry White
- CSI: NY (2008, TV series; "Sex, Lies, and Silicone") – Trevor Jones
- The Forgotten (2009, TV series; "Pilot") – Clay Thornton
- CSI (2009, TV Series; "Lover's Lane") - Kevin "X" Cross
- Drop Dead Diva (2009–2010, TV series; "Grayson's Anatomy", "Would I Lie to You?") – Ethan
- Private Practice (2009, TV series; "The Parent Trap") – Ronald Bergin
- Castle (2010, TV series; "The Mistress Always Spanks Twice") – Matt Haley
- The Gates (2010, TV series; "Repercussions", "What Lies Beneath") – Chad Taylor
- Fairly Legal (2011, TV series; "Believers") – Marcus
- Man-Teen (2012, Web series)
- The Mentalist (2014 "The Golden Hammer" - Gabriel Quinn)
- iZombie (2015 TV series)
- Mad Men (2015, TV series) – Stevie Wolcott
- Criminal Minds (2016, TV series, Season 11 Episode 20, "Inner Beauty") - Joseph Berzon
- The Last Ship (2016, TV series) - Jacob Barnes

=== Director ===
- Robbing Hef (2002)
- Something More (2003)
- Lawn Chairs and Living Rooms (2009)
- Bullies on Vacation (2010)
- PORK...a short film (2011)
- Low Fidelity (2011)
- The Inherited aka Stranger In The House (2015)
- Nashville (2017–2018)

=== Writer ===
- Robbing Hef (2002)
- Quarterlife (web series/NBC) (2 episodes, 2007)
- PORK...a short film (2010)
- Low Fidelity (2011)
