= Flight of Fancy (film) =

2000 film directed by Noel Quiñones

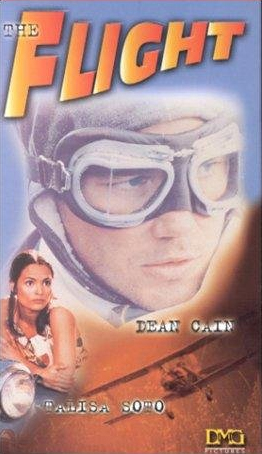
- Film poster
- Directed by: Noel Quiñones
- Written by: Noel Quiñones & Tom Musca (Story); Noel Quiñones & Tom Musca & Mark Kemble (Screenplay)
- Produced by: Robin Alper (co-producer); Ed Cathell III (Line Producer); Tom Musca; Morris Ruskin; Soraya Sesto (co-producer)
- Starring: Dean Cain; Talisa Soto; Miguel Sandoval; Kristian de la Osa; Juan Piedrahita
- Cinematography: Henner Hofmann; Raphy Molinary
- Edited by: Christopher Holmes
- Music by: Brahm Wenger
- Production companies: Echo Lake Entertainment; Economic Development Bank for Puerto Rico; Shoreline Entertainment
- Distributed by: DMG Entertainment; Platinum Disc; Velocity Home Entertainment
- Release dates: June 27, 2000 (Germany); August 6, 2000 (Hollywood Film Festival)
- Running time: 96 min.
- Country: Puerto Rico
- Language: English

Flight of Fancy is a 2000 Puerto Rican film directed and co-written by Noel Quiñones.

== Plot ==
A young single mother about to marry when a pilot crash-lands on her small island.

== Cast ==
- Dean Cain as Clay Bennett
- Talisa Soto as Mercedes Marquez
- Miguel Sandoval as Frank
- Kristian de la Osa as Gabriel Marquez
- Juan Piedrahita as Milo
- Carmen Moreno as Lazette
- Ron Michaels as Rugged Field Worker

== Reception ==
Flight of Fancy received three Hollywood Film Awards: "Best Latin Feature" for Noel Quiñones, "Best Family Film" and "Best Latino Film" for Tom Musca.

The Movie Scene gave the film three out of five stars, stating: "What this all boils down to is that "Flight of Fancy" is in truth a difficult movie to watch as you really have to be in the right mood for its innocent message driven storyline. But if you are it is a pleasant movie which will warm your heart."
