= Son of Sam (disambiguation) =

Son of Sam or David Berkowitz (born 1953) is an American serial killer.

Son of Sam may also refer to:

- Son of Sam (band), an American horror punk band
- Son of Sam, an Australian hip-hop artist, and member of the group Lgeez
- Son of Sam (album), by Krizz Kaliko, 2013
- Son of Sam (EP), by Lucki, 2016
- "Son of Sam" (song), by Elliott Smith, 2000
- "Son of Sam"/"Bombs Over Broadway", a single by Violent Soho, 2010
- "Son of Sam", a song by Meat Beat Manifesto from Satyricon, 1992
- "Son of Sam", a song by Shinedown from The Sound of Madness, 2008
- Son of Sam, a fictional house in the 2002 film The Anarchist Cookbook

== See also ==
- Son of Sam law, any American law designed to keep criminals from profiting from the publicity of their crimes
- The Sons of Sam: A Descent Into Darkness, a 2021 TV docuseries
