= Unit production manager =

Responsible for the administration of a feature film or television production

In the cinema of the United States, a unit production manager (UPM) is the Directors Guild of America–approved title for the top below-the-line staff position, responsible for the administration of a feature film or television production. Non-DGA productions might call it the production manager or production supervisor. They work closely with the line producer. Sometimes the line producer is the UPM. A senior producer may assign a UPM more than one production at a time.

== Responsibility to a senior producer ==
A UPM is usually hired by a film producer or television producer, and is responsible for managing the production and regulating the costs of delivering the expected film or television show on budget at the end of principal photography. Typically, a producer will oversee all the cost-related decisions, including above-the-line expenditures (especially during pre-production). However, the UPM is responsible for the more detailed planning and execution of the below-the-line costs (primarily for physical production). The film's director will select important department heads (keys) or support personnel related to their work, including the casting director, cinematographer, costume designer, production designer, and film editor. For below-the-line matters, the UPM often negotiates deals (for location, equipment, etc.) and hires the remaining crew, typically on the recommendation of the keys and/or based on prior experience with trusted individuals.

The UPM frequently does not have any direct responsibilities with the creative direction of the film's narrative, although in some cases they will and can be consulted. Many budget decisions affect the creative direction of the project. They are to support the director's artistic vision on a daily physical production level.

Before principal photography begins both the producer and UPM work to secure as many of the production elements as possible, including a workable schedule and budget. Usually from a production office during pre-production, they may later divide their time between the office and the set while the film is being shot. An on-set trailer may also be used as a makeshift production office. Like nearly all members of a film crew, UPMs will typically remain on the shoot until the end of principal photography and can return if there are any reshoots. It is not atypical for a UPM to work 80-100 (or more) hours per week while a film is in production.

In the US, a union UPM is represented by The Directors Guild of America. Certain conditions must be adhered to on a union shoot in order to remain in good standing with the DGA. These include expected salary rates, working hours, overtime penalties, required meals and other related criteria.

Highly experienced UPMs bring great value to a project for their strategic and creative problem-solving skills. These individuals will positively affect the film's budget as well as the final outcome and quality of the film on multiple levels.

== Duties ==
The UPM, under the supervision of the employer, is required to coordinate, facilitate and oversee the preparation of the production unit or units (to the extent herein provided) assigned to him or her, all off-set logistics, day-to-day production decisions, locations, budget schedules and personnel. Without limitation, among the duties which the Employer must assign to the UPM or First Assistant are the supervision of or participation in the following:

- Prepare breakdown and preliminary shooting schedule.
- Prepare or coordinate the budget.
- Oversee preliminary search and survey of all locations and the completion of business arrangements for the same.
- Assist in the preparation of the production to ensure continuing efficiency.
- Supervise completion of the Production Report for each day's work, showing work covered and the status of the production, and arrange for the distribution of that report in line with the company's requirement.
- Coordinate arrangements for the transportation and housing of cast, crew and staff.
- Oversee the securing of releases and negotiate for locations and personnel.
- Maintain a liaison with local authorities regarding locations and the operation of the company.
- Setup the production office and systems in coordination with the Production Office Coordinator.
- Work with various unions (DGA, SAG, WGA, IATSE and TEAMSTERS) to submit and finalize contracts.
- Handle ATL (Above the Line) issues e.g. cast person wanting a larger trailer.
- Work with Accounting team to make sure that the film is set up in a way that is eligible for tax credits or rebates (if in a certain state/region that allows this).
