= Noel Quiñones =

Puerto Rican screenwriter, film director, and philanthropist

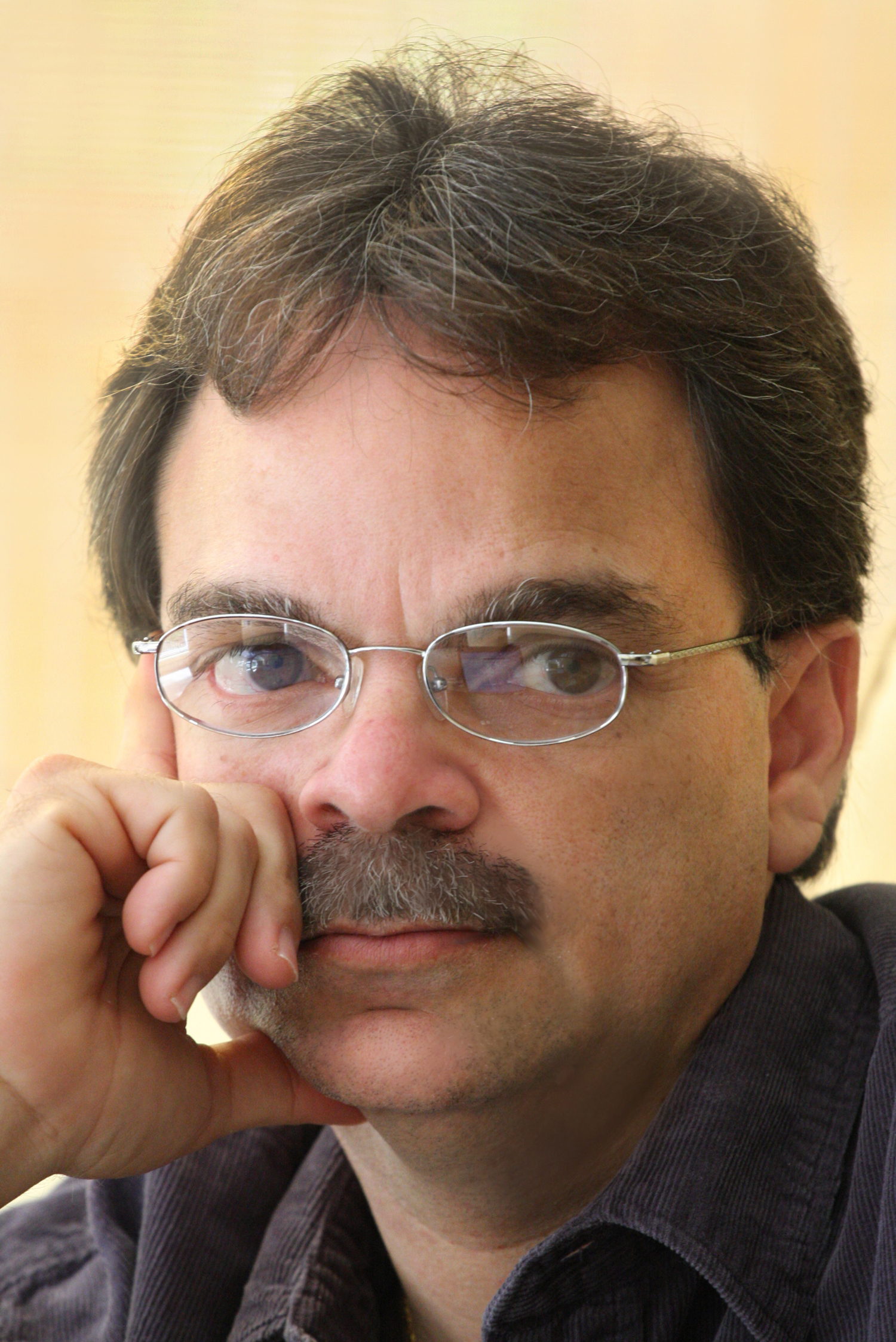
- Born: Noel A. Quiñones Motta; July 20, 1959 (age 65); Aguadilla, Puerto Rico
- Occupation(s): Screenwriter, film director, film producer, entrepreneur, philanthropist
- Years active: 1977–present
- Spouse: Soraya Sesto

Noel Quiñones (born Noel A. Quiñones Motta; July 20, 1959) is a Puerto Rican screenwriter, film director, producer, entrepreneur and philanthropist who divides his time between filmmaking and advocating for improvements in public education in countries around the world, such as Brazil, Puerto Rico, Chile, Colombia, Peru, Costa Rica, Argentina, Spain, Mexico and the United States of America. He won an Emmy for his work and currently does motivational speaking now that he is in a wheelchair due to a spinal cord disease.

== Early life ==
Quiñones was born in Aguadilla, Puerto Rico, the son of Santiago Quiñones Elías, a lawyer and Miriam Motta Ferrer, a homemaker. He attended primary school and secondary school in Puerto Rico and, at the age of 18, he left Puerto Rico to study cinematography and film-making at Columbia College and UCLA in Hollywood, California. He graduated at age 21.

== Career ==
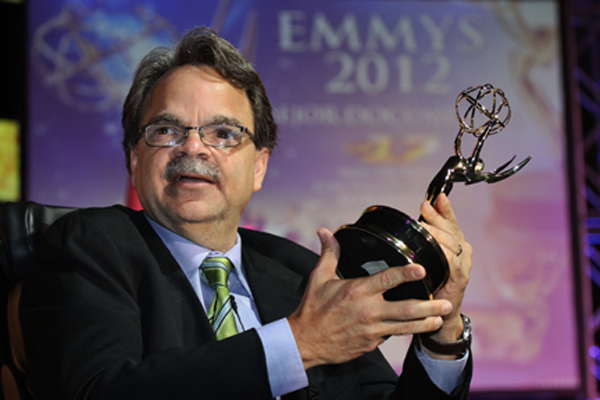
Quiñones holding the Emmy he received for his film 17

While still in high school, Quiñones completed his first film, a thirty-minute piece called Seniors, which was shot entirely on 16mm film and featured his classmates. After he produced a film for his high school's talent show, Quiñones's decided to pursue a career as a filmmaker. Upon completion of his education in California, Quiñones returned to his Puerto Rico, and established a production company that produced television commercials for international clients. Profits from his commercial work allowed Quiñones to produce his first feature film, Columbus' Legacy (original title: Raíces Eternas) on the history and evolution of Puerto Rican culture. The film was played in Old San Juan in 2019 during the 500th anniversary of San Juan, Puerto Rico commemoration.

In 1985, he produced Columbus' Legacy, which was narrated in its English version by Oscar-winning Puerto Rican actor José Ferrer. In 1986, the film won a Silver Award in the Houston International Film Festival. In 1989, he produced The Bell and San Juan Story, and worked with artists such as writer/director Jacobo Morales, and actresses Cordelia González and Rosanna DeSoto. These films garnered Quiñones fourteen awards in local and international festivals. In 1994, he collaborated with Tom Musca and playwright Mark Kemble to produce Flight of Fancy (2000), which was the winner of Best Film with a Latin theme at the Hollywood International Film Festival and Best Film at The Renaissance City Film Festival in Rhode Island, both in 2001.

Quinõnes' film work also includes 17 (original title: Los 17), a documentary about educational transformation in Puerto Rico, which was the winner of Best Short Documentary at the Rincón International Film Festival in Rincón, Puerto Rico in 2012. He also produced 100,000, a documentary about the problem of stray dogs in Puerto Rico. He produced the documentary "One on One" (original title: "Uno a Uno"), which examines the cycle of poverty and crime for students that drop out of school, and presents his mentorship program that works to keep students in school.

== Speaking career ==
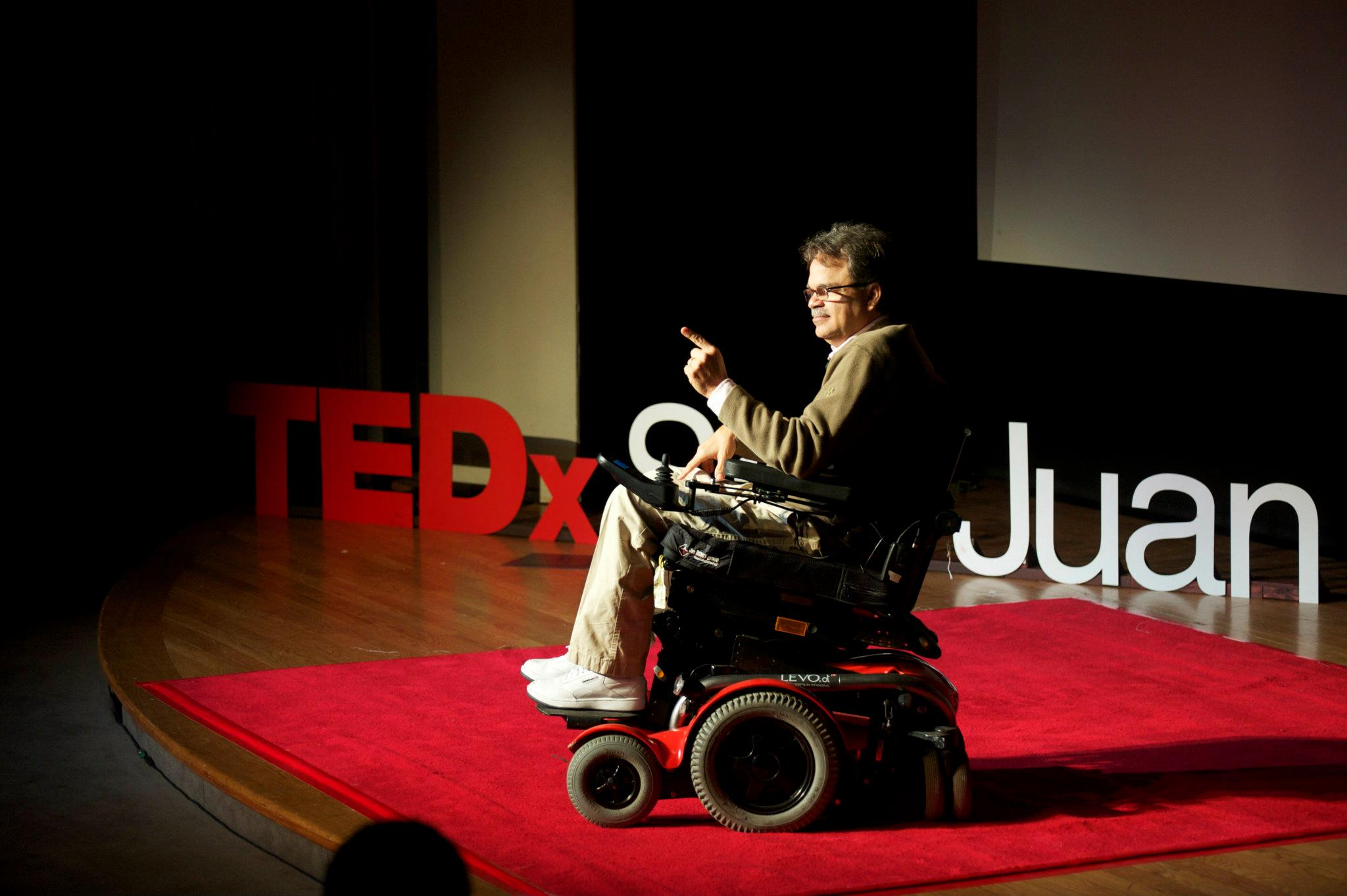
Quinones at TEDxSanJuan

In addition to filmmaking, Quiñones works as a motivational speaker to advocate for quality in public education. In December 2011, he was one of eleven speakers invited to the first TEDx SanJuan symposium in Puerto Rico. He spoke about how public education can be transformed by an integrated program to motivate and prepare students for the academic rigors they must address in order to succeed.

== Philanthropic activities ==
While touring schools that were screening his film, Flight of Fancy, Quiñones and his wife observed the run-down condition of the classrooms, the dearth of technology, and the lack of disciplinary structure present at these schools. In 2005, after four years of interviewing students, teachers, administrators and parents, he established the philanthropic organization Operation Éxito to improve the quality of Puerto Rico's public education system. Operation Éxito's goal is to use technology and motivational strategies to develop skills and inquisitive attitudes among students towards learning science and mathematics. Since its inception, Operation Éxito has evolved beyond Puerto Rico to other Spanish-speaking countries, as well as the United States of America.

Quiñones observed that students who drop out of school prematurely frequently begin a family and financially support themselves with multiple minimum wage jobs or crime. In 2012, he developed the One on One (original title: Uno a Uno) program to increase graduation rates and improve the future quality of life for students who were performing poorly in school. One on One matches certified mentors recruited from successful community and business leaders with at-risk students to improve their academic performance. The program was initiated in a school in Aguadilla, Puerto Rico where graduation rates were as low as 49%, and almost 100% of the participants graduated from high school. In 2017, the US Conference of Mayors presented the city of Aguadilla with its High Achievement Livability award for cities with 100,000 inhabitants or less for the implementation and results of the One On One program.

Quiñones's philanthropic efforts are also directed at the Sor Isolina Ferré Center and its dedication to the transformation of communities and society in general through education. He also supports the Miami Project to Cure Paralysis.

== Filmography ==
| Year | Film | Awards | Notes |
|---|---|---|---|
| 1986 | Raíces Eternas | Silver Award in the Houston International Film Festival (1986) | |
| 1989 | San Juan Story | CINE Golden Eagle Award (Entertainment Category, 1991) Academy Award semi-finalist for Best Live Action Short (1992). Official selection in: Los Angeles International Film Festival, AFI Las Americas Festival, and New York International Film Festival | |
| 1989 | The Bell | CINE Golden Eagle (Entertainment Category, 1991), The World Fest, Houston, The Cindy Award, The American Film and Video Association Award and the Chicago Film Festival Merit Award (1990) | |
| 2000 | Flight of Fancy | Best Latin Movie and Best Children's Movie in the wood International Film Festival (2001), Best movie in the Renaissance City Film Festival in Rhode Island (2001). | featuring Talisa Soto, Dean Cain, Miguel Sandoval and Kristian de la Osa |
| 2010 | Los 17 | EMMY award (2012) and winner of Best Documentary Short in the Rincón International Film Festival (Rincón PR, 2012) | |
| 2010 | 100,000 | EMMY award for best documentary (Suncoast Chapter 2011), Official selection in the Blue Planet Film Festival (Los Angeles, 2010), the DSRL Fest (Vancouver, 2010), the Rincón International Film Festival (Rincón, PR, 2011), the Puerto Rico International Film Festival (Vieques, PR, 2011) and the Aruba International Film Festival (2011). | |
| 2017 | One on One | Local Winner - Short Films, 2017 Fine Arts International Film Festival (San Juan, 2017) | |

== Personal life ==
Quiñones has been paraplegic from the age of sixteen due to a hemorrhage of a tumor in his spinal cord. He is married to Soraya Sesto and together the couple has a daughter.

== See also ==
- List of Puerto Rican films
