= The Young Unknowns =

- Directed by: Catherine Jelski
- Written by: Catherine Jelski
- Starring: Devon Gummersall; Arly Jover; Eion Bailey; Leslie Bibb
- Release date: 2000
- Running time: 87 minutes
- Country: United States
- Language: English

The Young Unknowns is a 2000 American drama film written and directed by Catherine Jelski and starring Devon Gummersall, Arly Jover, Eion Bailey and Leslie Bibb. It is Jelski’s feature directorial debut.

== Cast ==
- Devon Gummersall as Charlie
- Arly Jover as Paloma
- Eion Bailey as Joe
- Leslie Bibb as Cassandra

== Reception ==
The film has a 14% rating on Rotten Tomatoes based on 29 reviews.

Hank Sartin of the Chicago Reader gave the film a negative review and wrote, "This bleak little drama started as a play, and I'd bet that even onstage it felt contrived."

Chris Parcellin of Film Threat also gave the film a negative review and wrote, "The film wants to be a revealing character study of aimless Hollywood wannabes, but the story is just not compelling enough to make the viewer care."
