= Vampires: Los Muertos =

- Release poster
- Directed by: Tommy Lee Wallace
- Written by: Tommy Lee Wallace
- Produced by: Jack Lorenz; John Carpenter
- Starring: Jon Bon Jovi; Cristián de la Fuente; Natasha Gregson Wagner; Arly Jover; Darius McCrary; Diego Luna
- Cinematography: Henner Hofmann
- Edited by: Charles Bornstein
- Music by: Brian Tyler
- Production company: Storm King Productions
- Distributed by: Destination Films
- Release date: September 25, 2002
- Running time: 90 minutes
- Countries: United States; Mexico
- Language: English

Vampires: Los Muertos is a 2002 direct-to-video horror Western film written and directed by Tommy Lee Wallace and starring Jon Bon Jovi as a vampire hunter. A sequel to the 1998 film Vampires, it was produced by John Carpenter (who directed the original film). It’s an international co-production between the United States and Mexico. Vampires: Los Muertos introduces new characters, and the only reference to the previous film is the mention of Father Adam Guiteau from the original film, who has since died, as well as the legendary Béziers Cross, which was unsuccessfully used in the first film to perform a ritual that enables vampires to survive daylight. The film was followed by a sequel, Vampires: The Turning (2005).

== Plot ==
A man on the streets searches for a prostitute, and when he finds one, he threatens her with a razor blade. Derek Bliss steps in and points an odd-looking gun at his left temple. The man backs away, and the prostitute thanks Derek and asks if she can do anything for him. He shoots her with three stakes, as she was a vampire. Derek drags her to an abandoned car lot and watches the body catch fire in the sunlight while filming it on camera.

When he gets back to his hotel room, the Van Helsing Group leader calls him and informs him that he has a new job. He goes down to Mexico to a monastery where a group of vampire-hunting priests are staying. He has a strange vision, and one of the priests concludes that the vampires may be linking up with him.

That night, Una, a vampire princess, and her fledglings attack and feed upon a man. The next day, Derek goes looking for people on a list he has been given. Unfortunately, most of them are dead or crazy, and the last living ones are killed. Derek goes to a coffee shop and asks for a man named Jesse. He tells Derek to wait while he finishes up something. Derek then meets a young woman named Zoey, and he grows suspicious when she asks him if he works in the "undead" business. He leaves to go to the bathroom, and finds out that Zoey is a vampire by using a special lens, lamenting the fact as he thinks she's cute. In the split second it takes him to throw a paper towel in the trash, Una comes in, slashes the throats of every customer, and kidnaps Jesse.

When Derek comes out and sees that Zoey has also fled, he concludes that she must have done it. The next day, he pulls over when he sees her on the side of the road in daylight. They argue; Zoey tells him about special pills she takes to fight off her vampire side. She got bit accidentally by a vampire during a one-night stand. She has a vision of a monastery, and Derek realizes that it is the one where he just left. They drive back and find all but one priest slaughtered. Father Rodrigo tells them that Una is seeking the legendary Béziers Cross, the same cross used unsuccessfully in the first film used to perform a ritual that will enable vampires to walk in daylight and be invulnerable and shows them something a fellow priest was working on in his spare time: a huge van complete with all the necessary vampire-slaying tools. Derek hears a noise in the trees, and finds a teenager that he had met before. His name is Sancho, and he has a permission slip from his mother, stating he can go on the vampire hunt with Derek.

The group meet up with another hunter, Ray Collins from Memphis, and go after Una. Una seduces Ray and convinces him to leave Zoey's pills where she can get them. When they reach the village where the vampires are hiding out, they are welcomed because they want the vampires killed. Una, now able to walk in daylight, goes out and kidnaps Zoey. Derek aims the gun at Sancho and says he must have given the pills to Una. However, a villager realizes that Ray did it, and shoots him before Derek shoots Sancho. Derek and the gang go after Zoey to rescue her, at the cost of leaving Rodrigo to properly perform the ritual. They go back to a clinic, where Zoey's vampire blood is exchanged for human blood; as her pills were all used, this method is the only way to suppress her vampire side for a time. Derek knows how to save Rodrigo; the vampire blood is pumped into his body.

The team goes after Rodrigo and find out that he was not a real priest. Una is not daunted, and she responds by lighting a fire beneath his feet. Derek saves Rodrigo, and goes after Una. They almost kill her, but she escapes when the cord which was dragging her into the sunlight snaps. She catches Derek, but Derek then grabs what is left of the cord. Before they reach the sunlight, Derek shoots her head off with a shotgun and sends it flying into the sun, where it catches fire. Her body turns into stone with a black beating heart in the chest. Derek drives a stake into the heart. Sancho and Rodrigo decide to stay in the village, and Derek and Zoey drive away in the sunset to resupply on pills.

== Cast ==
- Jon Bon Jovi as Derek Bliss
- Cristián de la Fuente as Father Rodrigo
- Natasha Gregson Wagner as Zoey
- Arly Jover as Una
- Darius McCrary as Ray Collins
- Diego Luna as Sancho
- Geraldine Zinar as Mesera

== Reception ==
Vampires: Los Muertos was released straight-to-home video on September 25, 2002, though it did play theatrically in Mexico and Japan, where the first film had been very successful. On Rotten Tomatoes, the film has an approval rating of 20% based on reviews from 5 critics. David Nusair of Reel Film Reviews gave it 2.5 out of 4, and wrote: "Vampires: Los Muertos is far more entertaining than it has any right to be, mostly due to Wallace's inventive direction and Bon Jovi's engaging lead performance."
