= Planning the Low-Budget Film =

Book by Robert Latham Brown

First edition

Planning the Low-Budget Film is a 2006 book by Robert Latham Brown describing the processes involved in scheduling and budgeting motion pictures.

Brown is a 30-year veteran of motion picture production and he uses his experiences on many well-known films to illustrate his points. The book is a covers topics ranging from breaking down a film script to creating a budget, finding locations, dealing with the personalities, and hiring the crew. It also includes an appendix, glossary, and index.

== Scheduling ==
The books goes into detail describing a shooting sequence and how to recognize one. This is the unit of the script that is used in scheduling. Brown states that a shooting sequence is a piece of the script that has a single action, uses essentially the same cast throughout its length, is contiguous in time, and can be shot in one place. Borrowing on studies of ancient Greek drama, he calls these the four "unities" of a shooting sequence.

== Publication history ==
- Chalk Hill Books, 2006, paperback (ISBN 978-0976817802)
- Chalk Hill Books, 2013, paperback (ISBN 978-0976817840)
