= Below-the-line (filmmaking) =

Section of film budget

"Below-the-line" is a term derived from the top sheet of a film budget for motion pictures, television programs, industrial films, independent films, student films and documentaries as well as commercials. The "line" in "below-the-line" refers to the separation of production costs between script and story writers, producers, directors, actors, and casting ("above the-line") and the rest of the crew, or production team.

The top sheet of any creative project's budget serves only as an at-a-glance reference to a fully detailed and attached main budget document, which features total expenses including federal, state and local taxes, as well as insurance within the entire production, and/or production incentives. This painstaking task is usually assigned to the Production Manager or UPM of a production, and should be completed before principal photography begins for any project.

== Below-the-line crew ==
Some below-the-line film and television film crews operate in pre-production, production, or post-production stages of filmmaking. For example, the film editor may work solely in the post-production stage of filming but might also work throughout the production, editing the film as it is shot and advising the director if and when additional shots or scenes are needed. The boom operator, on the other hand, is mostly on set during filming because they have to pick up the dialogue of the actors as well as ambient noise when the scene is being recorded.

This particular type of film crew usually belongs to a guild or union. Some of the unions and/or guilds that represent below-the-line crew include: I.A.T.S.E., The Teamsters, Motion Picture Editors Guild, Animation Guild, and the Motion Picture Sound Editors.

It is usually the case for the "below-the-line" crew to work for hourly wages, as opposed to a set wage, or negotiated contractual wage on the front, or back end of any given project. These set workers are responsible for a number of many other unsung, and demanding tasks that must be completed to achieve the common goal of creating a film, or television program. These are the people "behind-the-scenes" that may be considered "less glamorous", but are very much the unsung heroes on every set of film production

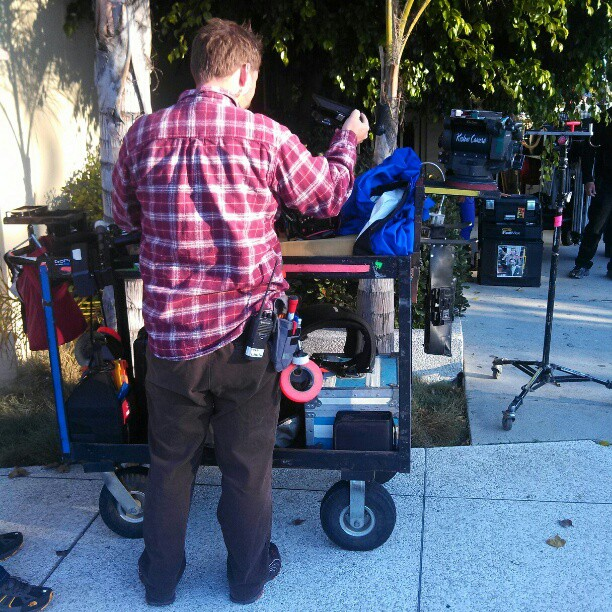
Camera Assistant with Steadicam on the set of a television series at Olympia Medical Center, Miracle Mile, Los Angeles.

Entry-level positions in the film industry include roles such as lighting technicians, grips, wranglers, stunt performers, property masters, automated dialogue replacement (ADR) specialists, Foley artists, set painters and stagehands. These roles can provide opportunities to gain experience and develop skills in film production.

"Below-the-line" crew refers to everybody else including:

- Assistant director
- Art director
- Best boy electric and grip
- Boom operator
- Camera operator
- Carpenter (theatre)
- Character generator (CG) operator (television)
- Director of photography
- Costume designer
- Composer
- Dolly grip
- Film editor
- Gaffer
- Graphic artist
- Grip
- Hair stylist
- Key grip
- Line producer
- Location manager
- Make-up artist
- Production assistant
- Production coordinator
- Rigging Grip
- Script supervisor (continuity)
- Set construction
- Set Medic
- Sound engineer
- Stage manager (television)
- Technical director (TD) (television)
- Truck driver
- Unit production manager
- Video control broadcast engineering (television)
- Visual effects supervisor

== See also ==
- Above-the-line (filmmaking)
- Film budgeting
- Film crew
- Television crew
- List of IATSE locals
