= Above-the-line (filmmaking) =

Term in filmmaking

"Above-the-line" refers to the list of individuals who guide and influence the creative direction, process, and voice of a given narrative in a film and related expenditures. These roles include but are not limited to the screenwriter, producer, director, and principal cast.

Often, the term is used for matters related to the film's production budget. Above-the-line expenditures reflect the expected line item compensation for an official above-the-line member's role in a given film project. These expenditures are usually set, negotiated, spent and/or promised before principal photography begins. They include rights to secure the material on which the screenplay is based, production rights to the screenplay, compensation for the screenwriter, producer, director, principal actors and other cost-related line items such as assistants for the producers, director or actors.

The distinction originates from the early studio days when the budget top-sheet would literally have a line separating the above-the-line and below-the-line costs.

== See also ==
- Below-the-line (filmmaking)
- Billing (performing arts)
- Film budgeting
- Film crew
- Television crew
