= Filming permit =

Permission for shooting film scenes in public spaces

Filming permits are permits issued by governments to allow the filming of motion pictures. Every city and state has some sort of council or office that handles filming permits. Obtaining film permits is part of the process of location scouting, and they are usually the responsibility of the location manager. Permits are issued prior to the shooting with details about location, date, time, equipment, personnel, special effects, actions and stunts.

The process of applying for filming permits may include fees and often requires production insurance. Sometimes this process is handled directly by the city, and sometimes it is handled by a non-profit organization such as FilmLA in Los Angeles. In addition, each state may have its own permitting commission for state land. The process of film permitting can often make it difficult for independent and amateur filmmakers.

Filming in large cities is generally more tightly controlled. Less populated areas may waive fees or have looser requirements and regulations, either because filming is less frequent, or because they hope to attract more production.

In their email request, the film company should specify the type and working title of the project (movie, TV series, commercial, music video) and list the locations selected, as well as the day, time and exact street location that needs to be covered, plus a detailed description of the film crew's activities at that time. It is also necessary to specify how many people are in the team, what vehicles they will arrive in and where they intend to set them up, whether they have a crane, trailers, cargo vans or a generator, and where the main production base is located. In addition, the movie office will want to know the future locations of cameras, spotlights and "no parking" signs, as well as whether and what kind of pyrotechnics will be used (gunshots, explosions, smoke, sparks or any other type of fire), as law enforcement and local residents must be notified about such things.

It costs money to go through the process of requesting and issuing a permit to film, any changes to the plan will also require additional fees, as will the possible hiring of police officers to keep order and manage traffic congestion - and that's not counting the basic amount the movie company will pay the city.

Depending on where the shooting takes place, the community may need to be notified. Notices should be pasted near phone booths in apartment buildings. This should be done approximately 72–96 hours before the first shooting day begins.

Usually, permission for filming must be granted at least 48 hours in advance, as the authorities must have time to inform the police about the need for possible street closures, remove parked cars from the roadside and organize traffic diversion.
