= Location library =

A location library or location archive is a collection of visual and references information, usually organized by a serial numbering system, descriptive keywords, geographic location (or more often than not a combination of the aforementioned) of locations, or places that might be used for filming or photography.

A location library can offer many services, including contracts to the production company and to the location owner or agent as well as location scouting services. If one requires a location with certain criteria that are not included in the library, then the library can, usually for a fee, provide a location scout who will travel around a given area (usually chosen for its geographic location, near enough to the production company to keep shoot costs down) and find a location that not only fits a brief supplied by the production company but also fits the budget for the shoot.

A location library may carry locations of many types including commercial property as well as residential properties and usually, they are able to help organise a shoot in almost any location, on their library or not.

Not only can a location library find the location for a shoot, but it can help with permits for parking and filming.

Location libraries are not just a location resource for TV and film, they are also a database of photogenic location houses, apartments, industrial and event spaces for editorial publications, stills advertising photo shoots and PR shots for brands and celebrities.

Property owners can register their properties with a location library to be considered as locations for commercial hire. Requirements for any location are that it has good-sized rooms, large enough to comfortably fit a photographic crew of around 10–15 people, natural light, interesting features, décor, style of property and furniture will play a role in a property being eligible as a location property. Location owners are paid for the use of their property. A photoshoot will pay between £500 and £1000 per day and film in excess of £1200 (rates as of 2014).

== See also ==
- Filming location
- Location scouting
- Location manager
- Film production
- Recce (filmmaking)
