= Eva Monley =

Kenyan film producer (1923–2011)

- Born: 29 April 1923; Berlin, Germany
- Died: 12 November 2011 (aged 88)
- Citizenship: Kenyan
- Occupations: Location scout, production manager and film producer

Eva Monley (April 29, 1923 – November 12, 2011) was a Kenyan location scout, production manager and film producer. Monley, an expert on filming in Africa, helped many of Hollywood's best known film directors and producers film on location throughout the continent, including Steven Spielberg, Otto Preminger, John Ford, and David Lean.

== Biography ==
=== Early life ===
Monley was born in Berlin, Germany on April 29, 1923. She fled Nazi Germany with her mother, eventually settling in Kenya Colony, which later became the independent nation of Kenya. Over time, Monley achieved fluency in the Swahili language and became an expert on East African cultures.

=== Film career ===
Monley took a position as a secretary in Nairobi. While working that job, Monley was hired in her first job involving film. Monley worked as a script supervisor and assistant for the 1950 movie, King Solomon's Mines. King Solomon's Mines shot on location throughout Kenya Colony, Belgian Congo and Tanganyika (present-day Tanzania). Once production had finished, Monley was hired in a similar position as assistant and script supervisor for the 1951 film The African Queen, directed by John Huston. A string of behind-the-scenes positions for American and British film productions soon followed including The Snows of Kilimanjaro in 1952, White Witch Doctor in 1953, and Mogambo, a 1953 movie directed by John Ford.

In addition to her work with productions based in Africa, Monley worked outside Africa as well. She worked on two films produced in India, The Rains of Ranchipur, which was directed by Jean Negulesco and starred Lana Turner, and 1956's Bhowani Junction, a George Cukor-directed film adaptation of the novel. She also worked as the location manager for Lawrence of Arabia for two years.

In 1960, Monley began a five film collaboration with director Otto Preminger as his production manager for Exodus. Monley subsequently worked as production manager for - The Cardinal in 1963, In Harm's Way in 1965, Bunny Lake Is Missing in 1965 and Hurry Sundown in 1967.

Monley switched to associate producer for a number of films later in her career. Her associate production credits included the 1977 horror film The Pack; 1979's The Promise by Gilbert Cates; Champions in 1983; and Highlander in 1986. She used her expertise as both an associate producer and film scout for Mister Johnson, which was shot on location in Nigeria by Bruce Beresford.

Monley produced the 1993 Walt Disney Pictures and Amblin Entertainment film, A Far Off Place, which starred Reese Witherspoon. The movie was adapted from the book of the same name, written by South African writer, Laurens van der Post.

Her numerous other credits in other production roles included Billion Dollar Brain in 1967, The Black Windmill in 1974, The Man Who Would Be King in 1975, Sydney Pollack's Out of Africa in 1985, and Steven Spielberg's 1987 film adaption, Empire of the Sun.

Monley was a recipient of the British Film Institute's lifetime achievement award. She donated her papers and writings related to her film work to the Margaret Herrick Library of the Academy of Motion Picture Arts & Sciences.

Eva Monley died at her home in Nanyuki, Kenya, on November 12, 2011, at the age of 88.

The Location Managers Guild of America honored the memory of Eva Monley at their inaugural award show in 2013 by naming their honorary award to an industry professional that has demonstrated ‘above and beyond’ support of the work of location professionals after her. The first recipient of the award went to multiple Academy Award winning Director Alexander Payne for his masterful use of location as another character in movies such as Sideways, The Descendants, and Nebraska.
