= Location Managers Guild International =

LMGI
- Location Managers Guild International
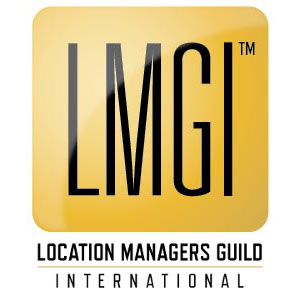
- Founded: December 2, 2003
- Headquarters: Hollywood, Los Angeles, California
- Location: United States
- Website: www.locationmanagers.org

The Locations Managers Guild International (LMGI) is a professional organization of location managers, location scouts, assistant location managers, and affiliated business members, such as film commissions, location services, vendors, and filming venues.

Founded in 2003 as the Location Managers Guild of America, the membership voted to rename the organization as the Location Managers Guild International in 2016 to recognize the global aspect of film-making and reflect the growing international presence of its membership.

The LMGI is not a labor union in that it does not represent location managers in wages or working conditions, leaving this responsibility to the respective local unions such as Teamsters Local 399 in Los Angeles, Teamsters Local 390 in Miami, and the Directors Guild of America in New York City and Chicago. The organization has both union and non-union member professionals.

== Membership ==
While the majority of the membership of the LMGI is based in Los Angeles where the guild was first established, many members began traveling to secondary production centers such as Atlanta, New Orleans, and Vancouver with the increasing dependence on production incentives, introduced their crews to the guild, and developed local location professional communities which in turn were invited to become members.

Foreign membership followed the increasing recognition of international locations such as New Zealand, Iceland, and Jordan through films such as The Lord of the Rings, Zero Dark Thirty, Interstellar, The Martian, and Star Wars: The Force Awakens. The merger of the former LMGA partner organization in the United Kingdom, Guild of Location Managers, into the Production Guild of Great Britain, also resulted in a number of British location managers seeking an organization that represented the craft exclusively.

Active membership is limited to professional location scouts and managers. Business membership consists of affiliated businesses with professional references.

== Projects ==
The LMGI regularly mounts large-scale, educational art projects in partnership with community groups.

Last Looks: The Ambassador Hotel

Over the weekend of March 20, 2005, just before demolition began on the Ambassador Hotel, the LMGA organized an outreach event wherein location scouts could photograph the historic location one last time, while mentoring students from Jefferson High School (located in the Central-Alameda neighborhood of Los Angeles) in the skills of script breakdown and location scouting. The student photographs were judged by a jury that included respected Hollywood luminaries Shane Black (writer, Lethal Weapon), Alice West (co-executive producer, Ugly Betty), and Missy Stewart (production designer, Good Will Hunting). The awards ceremony was held in June 2005 at the Beverly Hilton Hotel.

In 2006, the LMGA produced a photographic exhibit of images from the Ambassador Project at the Los Angeles City Hall, in the Office of the City Attorney. Student photographs were hung side by side with those of the professionals. The exhibit was featured on the front page of the Los Angeles Times calendar as an article accompanied by four full-color images.

Concentric Circles: Metro L.A. Revealed

In 2008, the LMGA, in conjunction with the Los Angeles County Metropolitan Transportation Authority, produced a photo essay entitled "Concentric Circles: Metro L.A. Revealed," exhibited at Beady Minces Art Gallery in Venice, California. Accompanied by Metro personnel, dozens of scouts rode bus and train lines across the city during the course of several weeks capturing unique images of Metro properties.

The resulting images provide a "scout's eye" view of various aspects of the Los Angeles Metro in the early 21st century. A book-bound catalog of film-friendly locations was created from this project as a marketing piece for the industry.

== LMGI Awards ==
The LMGA held their inaugural awards show in March 2014 with honors going to location managers Robert Boake for Game of Thrones and Ilt Jones for Iron Man 3, the Albuquerque Film Commission for Breaking Bad and Lone Survivor, and honorary awards to Haskell Wexler for his efforts in creating a safer working environment for below the line filmmakers, and the Eva Monley award to Alexander Payne for his masterful use of location as another character is films such as Sideways, The Descendants, and Nebraska.
