= A Far Off Place =

1993 film by Mikael Salomon

- Theatrical release poster
- Directed by: Mikael Salomon
- Screenplay by: Robert Caswell; Jonathan Hensleigh; Sally Robinson
- Based on: A Story Like the Wind and A Far Off Place by Laurens van der Post
- Produced by: Eva Monley; Elaine Sperber
- Starring: Reese Witherspoon; Ethan Randall; Jack Thompson; Maximilian Schell
- Cinematography: Juan Ruiz Anchía
- Edited by: Ray Lovejoy
- Music by: James Horner
- Production companies: Walt Disney Pictures; Amblin Entertainment; Touchwood Pacific Partners
- Distributed by: Buena Vista Pictures Distribution
- Release date: March 12, 1993
- Running time: 107 minutes
- Country: United States
- Language: English
- Box office: $12.9 million

A Far Off Place (aka Far Off Place and Kalahari) is a 1993 American adventure drama film directed by Mikael Salomon (in his directorial debut), and based on Laurens van der Post's works: A Story Like the Wind (1972) and A Far Off Place (1974). The film stars Reese Witherspoon, Ethan Randall, Jack Thompson, and Maximilian Schell. It follows three young teenagers crossing the Kalahari Desert after their parents are killed by a poacher.

A Far Off Place was filmed in Namibia and Zimbabwe from May to September 1992. A Far Off Place was released by Buena Vista Pictures Distribution on March 12, 1993. The film received mixed reviews from critics and grossed $12.9 million.

== Plot ==
Spirited Nonnie Parker wants to follow in her parents' footsteps as a wildlife commissioner fighting Africa's elephant poachers. Against his wishes, spoiled New York City teen Harry Winslow accompanies his father to the Kalahari Desert to spend time with family acquaintances Elizabeth and Paul, parents of Nonnie. The two clash.

That night, Nonnie and the family dog, Hintza, sneak out of the house to meet her bushman friend, Xhabbo. Harry follows them to a cave, where they spend the night helping Xhabbo recover his strength after he is attacked by a leopard.

At dawn, Nonnie returns to the house to discover that her parents and Harry's father have been murdered for investigating the export of ivory, a poaching operation secretly run by Paul Parker's associate, John Ricketts. Nonnie hides from the poachers but Ricketts realizes Nonnie and Harry are missing.

Nonnie manages to grab explosives and attach them to the bottom of the poachers' truck, killing several of Ricketts's men. She flees to the cave and Xhabbo advises them to "follow the wind" by heading west across the Kalahari Desert. On the edge of the desert, Xhabbo communicates with a herd of elephants and convinces them to cover their tracks by following behind. Harry is furious to learn they have 2,000 kilometers to travel before reaching the seaport of Karlstown, but Nonnie remains optimistic.

Meanwhile, the Parkers’ close friend, Colonel Mopani Theron, learns of the attack. Unaware of Ricketts's involvement, he orders Ricketts to lead an aerial search party to find the missing children. Harry attempts to flag down an approaching plane, thinking they are being rescued, but Nonnie warns they could be poachers and says they should hide.

Harry stuffs their clothes with straw to make fake decoy bodies which they place in the sand. In hiding, the children watch in horror as the plane passengers gun down the straw bodies. Nonnie sees it was Ricketts.

Over the next two months, the runaways dig up plant roots for sustenance, and Xhabbo teaches Harry how to speak his native language and hunt gemsbok. Harry creates a garment of gemsbok fur and gifts it to Nonnie. Theron remains convinced that the Parkers' death was a corporate conspiracy and continues his tireless search for the exporters' store of elephant tusks, which he believes will lead him to the killer.

Nonnie and Harry discover Xhabbo stung by a scorpion. While finding water, Nonnie collapses in the sand. Hearing the hum of Ricketts's approaching helicopter, Nonnie and Xhabbo weakly thump their chests in the spiritual Bushman practice of "tapping", summoning a sandstorm and forcing Ricketts to flee.

Unaware they are only a few hundred yards away from the Atlantic coast, the trio fall unconscious then awaken in a Karlstown hospital. There, Nonnie is reunited with Theron and informs him that Ricketts was responsible for her parents' deaths. Once they recover, Nonnie and Harry accompany him to Ricketts's mining facility, where they find his hoard of elephant tusks. They rig the place with dynamite and, just as Ricketts arrives, they lead him outside and light the fuse. Ricketts runs back into the mine trying to extinguish the flame, but the dynamite explodes and buries him within the mine.

Sometime later, Nonnie and Harry say goodbye to Xhabbo, who returns to the Kalahari. Harry kisses Nonnie before boarding an aircraft home to New York, and she tells him to leave without looking back. However, as Nonnie begins cleaning the charred remains of the Parker home, Harry returns, and they embrace.

== Cast ==
- Reese Witherspoon as Nonnie Parker
- Ethan Randall as Harry Winslow, Nonnie's love interest
- Jack Thompson as John Ricketts, Paul's associate
- Sarel Bok as Xhabbo, Nonnie's bushman friend
- Robert John Burke as Paul Parker, Nonnie's father
- Patricia Kalember as Elizabeth Parker, Nonnie's mother
- Daniel Gerroll as John Winslow, Harry's father
- Maximilian Schell as Col. Mopani Theron, Nonnie's godfather
- Miles Anderson as Jardin
- Taffy Chihota as Warden Robert
- Magdalene Damas as Nuin-Tara

== Production ==
Producer Eva Monley obtained the rights to Laurens van der Post's novels A Story Like the Wind and A Far Off Place in 1980. An early draft of the screenplay by Jonathan Hensleigh featured a young male protagonist as depicted in the source material, but filmmakers later had Sally Robinson do rewrites to change the protagonist to a girl.

Casting the role of Xhabbo took more than seven months as talent scouts met with over 4,000 Bushmen from four African countries. Sarel Bok, a musician of Bushman descent, was cast in April 1992, after being discovered in Cape Town, South Africa.

Principal photography took place from May to September 1992. Kalahari Desert scenes were filmed in the Namib Desert, with additional locations at the Shamva Gold Mine outside Harare, and the Sesriem Desert in Namibia.

The original director and cinematographer were Rene Manzor and Paul Gyulay, respectively, but they were fired by Disney two weeks into production. Steven Spielberg recommended Mikael Salomon to direct, making A Far Off Place Salomon's directorial debut.

The aircraft featured in A Far Off Place included a Cessna 180G Z-WLK, a Bell 206B JetRanger III, ZS-HAJ, a Cessna 421A Golden Eagle, Z-WMB, and a Boeing 707-330B.

== Release ==
Walt Disney Pictures released the third and last Roger Rabbit animated short film, Trail Mix-Up, theatrically with A Far Off Place. As of 2025, the film has not streamed on Disney+.

== Reception ==
On review aggregator Rotten Tomatoes, the film holds a score of 42% based on reviews from 12 critics, with an average rating of 5 out of 10. Audiences polled by CinemaScore gave the film an average grade of "A-" on an A+ to F scale.

Film critic Roger Ebert criticized the plot and the level of violence. Awarding the film two stars, he singled out the film's premise which requires the characters to cross 2,000 kilometers to find help: "As perhaps the only American film critic who has in fact crossed the Kalahari Desert, twice, I could have saved them a lot of trouble. There were dozens of towns and villages within 100 miles of their starting place, and Cape Town itself would have been less than 2,000 kilometers away". He also noted the film's similarities to the 1971 Australian film Walkabout.

Ebert praised the performances and the photography, the latter of which he said "captures the forms of the sand dunes with real poetry". In addition, Ebert positively cited "the scenes where the young Bushman (Sarel Bok) teaches...survival lore, tells [the kids] the legends of his people, and laughs uproariously at their Westernized behavior". He lamented the film's strengths gave way to tired plot conventions and scenes of violence that are arguably above a PG rating.

Film historian and critic Leonard Maltin had mixed reactions to the storyline. He considered the plot "borderline-slow but head-on straight" and said that the "frank treatment of death makes this iffy for young kids, but older children should find it rewarding".

== See also ==
- African Cats (2011)
- Born Free (1966)
- Cheetah (1989)
- Duma (2005)
- The Last Lions (2011)
