= Location Managers Guild Awards =

Film and television awards

The original style LMGI awards await distribution prior to the 2016 ceremony

The Location Managers Guild International Awards are awarded at an annual show honoring outstanding contributions to location scouting in the film and television industries. The Location Managers Guild held its inaugural show in March 2014 at the Writers Guild Theater in Beverly Hills, with honors going to Location Managers Robert Boake (Game of Thrones), Ilt Jones (Iron Man 3), David Doumeng & Charlie Love (Nike), and the Albuquerque Film Commission (Breaking Bad).

Following the success of its first year, the LMGI has since continued to honor the outstanding creative contributions of location professionals around the world annually, currently held in October, at the start of the Hollywood awards season in Los Angeles, CA.

Originally called the LMGA Awards, the name of the awards changed with the guild's name change to reflect the international nature of filmmaking to the LMGI Awards in 2016.

In addition to the awards given for the best location professional in film, television, commercials, and film commission, the LMGI presents honorary awards to a location professional for lifetime achievement, to a trailblazer who has been a leader in furthering the recognition of location professionals in motion picture and television, a humanitarian award, and the Eva Monley award for an entertainment industry professional that has demonstrated 'above and beyond' support of the work of location professionals.

== LMGI Award winners and nominees ==
Winner in bold at the top of the list

=== 2025 ===
Date: August 23, 2025
Location: The Eli & Edythe Broad Stage at SMC Performing Arts Center, Santa Monica, CA
Host: Rachael Harris
Notable Guests: Claire Brooks, Ilt Jones, Don Pell, Actors Carmen Christopher, Maxwell Acee Donovan, Kate Linder, Keyla Monterroso Mejia, and Producer Ian Bryce

LMGI Award for Outstanding use of Locations
Award	Project	Recipient
Outstanding Locations in a Contemporary Film	**Mission: Impossible – Dead Reckoning Part One - Paramount**	**Ben Firminger, Jonas Christiansen, Morten Nelson, Niall O’Shea, Jason Roberts, Peter Bardsley, Jasmine Burridge, Clara Butler, Sam Millner**
Outstanding Locations in a Contemporary Film	• Anora – United International Pictures/Neon/Le Pacte	Ross Brodar
Outstanding Locations in a Contemporary Film	• A Real Pain - Searchlight Pictures	Michal Sliwkiewicz, Barbara Rusinek
Outstanding Locations in a Contemporary Film	• Conclave - Focus Features	Nausicaa Cecarini, Roberto Di Costa, Simona Prosperi
Outstanding Locations in a Contemporary Film	• Twisters– Universal/Warner Bros.	Janice Polley, Joe Stargensky
Outstanding Locations in a Period Film	**A Complete Unknown - Searchlight Pictures**	**Anthony Pisani**
Outstanding Locations in a Period Film	• The Apprentice– Briarcliff Entertainment	Richard Hughes
Outstanding Locations in a Period Film	• Fly Me to the Moon– Sony	Maida Morgan, Julieta Rey del Castillo
Outstanding Locations in a Period Film	• Gladiator II - Paramount/DreamWorks	Khalid Ameskane, Christian McWilliams, Joseph Formosa Randon
Outstanding Locations in a Period Film	• I’m Still Here – Sony/StudioCanal	Maria Maria Dunham, Gisele Prado
Outstanding Locations in a Period Film	• Sinners – Warner Bros.	Elston Howard
Outstanding Locations in Contemporary Television	**The Studio – Apple TV+**	**Stacey Brashear, Martin J. Cummins**
Outstanding Locations in Contemporary Television	• The Day of the Jackal – NBCUniversal	Balint Regius, Simon Nixon, Smiljan “Smiley” Tolj
Outstanding Locations in Contemporary Television	• Landman – Paramount+	Dustin Daniels, Stuart Berberich
Outstanding Locations in Contemporary Television	• The Last of Us Season 2 – HBO Max	Nicole Chartrand , Greg Jackson
Outstanding Locations in Contemporary Television	• Mobland – Paramount+	Steve Mortimore, Emily Coldwell, Lynsey Cosford
Outstanding Locations in Contemporary Television	• Slow Horses Season 4 – Apple TV+	Ian Pollington, Nick Renner, Stéphanie Perret
Outstanding Locations in Period Television	**1923 Season 2 – Paramount+**	**David Zachary Heine, James Crowley, Hayden Yancer**
Outstanding Locations in Period Television	• Dark Winds Season 3 – AMC	Nathan Bancroft, Connor McClafferty, Patrick King
Outstanding Locations in Period Television	• Godfather of Harlem Season 4 – MGM+	Chris Banks
Outstanding Locations in Period Television	• Hotel Portofino Season 3 – PBS/Beta Film Group	Tomislav “Pele” Peleski, Dean Lalić
Outstanding Locations in Period Television	• One Hundred Years of Solitude– Netflix	Emerson Espinosa Toledo
Outstanding Locations in Period Television	• The Walking Dead: Daryl Dixon Season 2 – AMC	Julie Belthoise, Antek Graczyk, Nicolas Foulatier
Outstanding Locations in Television, MOW or Limited Series	**The Penguin – HBO Max**	**Keith Adams**
Outstanding Locations in Television, MOW or Limited Series	• Adolescence – Netflix	Tom Bartram, Sharon Wood
Outstanding Locations in Television, MOW or Limited Series	• American Primeval – Netflix	Christian Diaz De Bedoya, Kyle Kernan
Outstanding Locations in Television, MOW or Limited Series	• Dope Thief - Apple TV+	Rudi Fischer, John Galloway, Chris Gormley
Outstanding Locations in Television, MOW or Limited Series	• Lockerbie: A Search for Truth – NBCUniversal	Leon Seth, Toufiq Aboubayd
Outstanding Locations in Television, MOW or Limited Series	• The White Lotus Season 3 – HBO Max	Kittipat “Pat” Boonvanno, Monchai “Once” Dajamornrattanakul, Bundit “Bank”Kaewsri
Outstanding Locations in a Commercial	**Orient Express, "Artisan of Travel" - Belmond**	**Cagdas Altun, Ozgur Oz, Bugra Baydar, Gokhan Seven**
Outstanding Locations in a Commercial	• Army National Guard, "Uncommon is Calling" - US Government PSA	David Warren, Valerie Warren
Outstanding Locations in a Commercial	• Diablo IV, "Vessel of Hatred" - Blizzard Entertainment	Thitikorn Sriborisut, Anek Thongcharoen
Outstanding Locations in a Commercial	• Lilo & Stitch, "The Super Bowl Commercial" - Disney	Yaw Amponsah Apenteng, Joyce Ayrakwa
Outstanding Locations in a Commercial	• Stella Artois, "David & Dave"- AB InBev	Jason Benfield, Carlos Aragon
Outstanding Film Commission	**"A Complete Unknown"**	**New Jersey Motion Picture & Television Commission**
Outstanding Film Commission	• "The Last of Us Season 2"	British Columbia Film Commission/Creative BC
Outstanding Film Commission	• "The Handmaid’s Tale Season 6"	City of Toronto Film Office
Outstanding Film Commission	• "Fountain of Youth"	Egypt Film Commission
Outstanding Film Commission	• "Sinners"	Film New Orleans
Outstanding Film Commission	• "1923 Season 2"	Montana Film Office

LMGI Honorary Awards
Lifetime Achievement Award	Trailblazer Award
**Ilt Jones**	Not Awarded
Humanitarian Award	Eva Monley Award
**Make-a-Wish Greater Los Angeles**	**Kevin Costner**

=== 2024 ===
Date: August 24, 2024
Location: Wallis Annenberg Center for the Performing Arts, Beverly Hills, CA
Host: Rachael Harris
Notable Guests: Actors Camilla Belle, Doug Jones, Kate Linder, Helena-Alexis Seymour; Olympian Gary Hall Jr.

LMGI Award for Outstanding use of Locations
Award	Project	Recipient
Outstanding Locations in a Contemporary Film	**Mission: Impossible – Dead Reckoning Part One - Skydance/Paramount**	**David Campbell-Bell, Enrico Latella, Jonas Fylling Christiansen, Niall O’Shea, Ben Firminger**
Outstanding Locations in a Contemporary Film	• Civil War – A24	Kellie Morrison, Melissa Mortensen
Outstanding Locations in a Contemporary Film	• Saltburn - MGM/Amazon	Harriet Lawrence, Philippa Sutcliffe, David Powell
Outstanding Locations in a Contemporary Film	• The Fall Guy - Universal	Phillip Roope, Lisa Scope, Daniella Watson
Outstanding Locations in a Contemporary Film	• The Killer – Netflix	William Doyle, Rosita Cannata, Boni Canto Porcella, Elston Howard, Adam Boor
Outstanding Locations in a Period Film	**Oppenheimer - Universal**	**Justin Duncan, Dennis Muscari, Patty Carey-Perazzo, T.C. Townsen**
Outstanding Locations in a Period Film	• Dune: Part Two – Legendary/Warner Bros	Duncan Broadfoot, Ghaith Al-Kurdi, Matt Craufurd, Sam Bather, Fuad Khahlil
Outstanding Locations in a Period Film	• Furiosa – Warner Bros	Jeremy Peek, Elsey Israel, Luke Kneller
Outstanding Locations in a Period Film	• Killers of the Flower Moon - Apple Studios	Mike Fantasia, Andrea Keener, Ted Alvarez, Kirsten Cornay, Miranda Carnessale
Outstanding Locations in a Period Film	• Napoleon – Apple Studios/Columbia	Steve Mortimore, Joseph Formosa Randon, Lynsey Cosford, Tom Barnes, Emily Coldwell
Outstanding Locations in a Period Film	• The Zone of Interest – A24	Michal Sliwkiewicz, Eugene Strange
Outstanding Locations in Contemporary Television	**Fargo season 5 – FX**	**Mohammad Qazzaz, Luke Antosz**
Outstanding Locations in Contemporary Television	• The Gentlemen – Netflix	Iggy Ellis, Lex Donovan
Outstanding Locations in Contemporary Television	• Mr. & Mrs. Smith – Amazon	Ryan Ferguson, Elisabetta Tomasso, Ross Brodar
Outstanding Locations in Contemporary Television	• Reservation Dogs Season 3 – FX	Chris Kucharski, Shane Brown
Outstanding Locations in Contemporary Television	• Slow Horses Season 3 – Apple TV+	Ian Pollington, Nick Renner
Outstanding Locations in Contemporary Television	• Sugar – Apple TV+	John Agolia, Jason Stowell
Outstanding Locations in Period Television	**Fallout – Amazon**	**Paul Kramer, Chris Arena, Mandi Dillin, David Park, Paul Van Der Ploeg**
Outstanding Locations in Period Television	• Bridgerton Season 3 – Netflix	Tony Hood
Outstanding Locations in Period Television	• The Crown Season 6 – Netflix	Mark Walledge, Daniel Sampedro Palerm, Michelle Pianca
Outstanding Locations in Period Television	• The Gilded Age – HBO	Lauri Pitkus, Alex Berard
Outstanding Locations in Period Television	• Palm Royale – Apple TV+	Stacey Brashear, Martin J. Cummins
Outstanding Locations in Period Television	• Tokyo Vice – HBO	Masanori Aikawa, Kota Suemitsu, Soichiro Hasumi, Hiroyuki Tamura, Mellisa Warry-Smith
Outstanding Locations in Limited Anthology Television	**Ripley – Netflix**	**Robin Melville, Giuseppe Nardi, Fabio Ferrante, Shane Haden**
Outstanding Locations in Limited Anthology Television	• Baby Reindeer – Netflix	Thomas Bosanquet, Sandeep Prasad, Josh Faux
Outstanding Locations in Limited Anthology Television	• Feud: Capote vs. The Swans – FX	Christopher Britton, James Adlesic, David Conway, Amanda Foley Burbank
Outstanding Locations in Limited Anthology Television	• Griselda - Netflix	Kris Bunting, Javier Ruisanchez
Outstanding Locations in Limited Anthology Television	• Masters of the Air – Apple TV+	Emma Pill, Eleanor Downey
Outstanding Locations in Limited Anthology Television	• True Detective: Night Country – HBO	Jethro Ensor, Thor Kjartansson, Robert Garcia, Einar Sveinn Thordarson
Outstanding Locations in a Commercial	**Toyota, "Present from The Past" -** Imperial Woodpecker	**Mark Freid, Paul Riordan**
Outstanding Locations in a Commercial	• Carhartt, "History in The Making" - Superprime	Rob Story
Outstanding Locations in a Commercial	• Coca-Cola, "Santa Stories – The Note" - Prettybird	Cathy Pearson, Manus Hingerty
Outstanding Locations in a Commercial	• NFL Super Bowl LVIII, "Born to Play" - 72andSunny	Yaw Amponsah Apenteng, Joyce Ayrakwa
Outstanding Locations in a Commercial	• Tesla, "Cybertruck"	Bui Baldvinsson, Alfred Gislason
Outstanding Film Commission	**"True Detective: Night Country"**	**Einar Tomasson - Film in Iceland**
Outstanding Film Commission	• "The Fall Guy"	City of Sydney & Screen NSW
Outstanding Film Commission	• "Indiana Jones and the Dial of Destiny"	Glasgow Film Office
Outstanding Film Commission	• "Oppenheimer"	New Mexico Film Office
Outstanding Film Commission	• "Killers of the Flower Moon"	The Oklahoma Film + Music Office & Tulsa Office of Film
Outstanding Film Commission	• "Dune: Part Two"	The Royal Film Commission – Jordan

LMGI Honorary Awards
Lifetime Achievement Award	Trailblazer Award
**Sue Quinn**	**Bill Bowling**
Humanitarian Award	Eva Monley Award
**Motion Picture & Television Fund**	Not Awarded

=== 2023 ===
Date: August 26, 2023
Location: The Eli & Edythe Broad Stage at SMC Performing Arts Center, Santa Monica, CA
Host: (No host due to the 2023 SAG-AFTRA strike)
Notable Guests: Actor Tim Daly (as president of the Creative Coalition); Directors Hanelle Culpepper & Taylor Hackford; Production Designers Rick Carter, Stefan Dechant, & Jeannine Oppewall.

LMGI Award for Outstanding use of Locations
Award	Project	Recipient
Outstanding Locations in a Contemporary Film	**John Wick: Chapter 4 - Lionsgate**	**Simon Daniel, Pascal Ricuolt, Antonin Depardieu, Ghaith Al-kurdi, Daisei Susami, Morgan Roche**
Outstanding Locations in a Contemporary Film	• Glass Onion: A Knives Out Mystery – Netflix	Stefanos Koutsardakis
Outstanding Locations in a Contemporary Film	• Guy Ritchie's The Covenant - Amazon/MGM	Jaime Polo Garrón, Richard Fábrega, Tate Aráez
Outstanding Locations in a Contemporary Film	• Tár - Focus/Universal	David Pieper
Outstanding Locations in a Contemporary Film	• Troll – Netflix	Audun Skarbøvik, Leo Resnes, Espen Rudi
Outstanding Locations in a Period Film	**All Quiet on the Western Front - Netflix**	**Petr Růčka, Marek Řídel, Jan Ondrovčák**
Outstanding Locations in a Period Film	• Argentina, 1985 – Amazon	Marcelo Martinez
Outstanding Locations in a Period Film	• The Banshees of Inisherin – Searchlight	Eoin Holohan
Outstanding Locations in a Period Film	• The Fabelmans - Universal	Leann Emmert, Peter Gluck
Outstanding Locations in a Period Film	• The Woman King – Tristar/Sony	Luke Longmore, Neville Botha
Outstanding Locations in Contemporary Television	**The Last of Us – HBO**	**Jason Nolan, Mohammad Qazzaz**
Outstanding Locations in Contemporary Television	• Jack Ryan (Season 3) – Amazon	Jason Wheeler, Jon Roper, Leda Bouzoukou, Nick Oliver, Balint Regius
Outstanding Locations in Contemporary Television	• Succession (Season 4) – HBO	Paul Eskenazi, Sue Quinn, Rahmat Jean-Pierre, Steve M. Royset, Carolyn Schultz
Outstanding Locations in Contemporary Television	• The Diplomat – Netflix	Ashton Radcliffe, Matt Winter, Alphonse Huynh, Ollie Bradbury
Outstanding Locations in Contemporary Television	• The Handmaid's Tale (Season 5) – Hulu/MGM	Anne Richardson, Jeremy Pinard
Outstanding Locations in Contemporary Television	• The Old Man – FX	Dan Cooley, Ben McCrea
Outstanding Locations in Period Television	**1923 – Paramount**	**D. Zachary Heine, Johan Van Der Walt, Joseph Formosa Randon, James Crowley, Eduard Klarenbeek**
Outstanding Locations in Period Television	• Peaky Blinders (Season 6) – Netflix	Jessica Dove, Matt Green, Leon Seth
Outstanding Locations in Period Television	• Perry Mason (Season 2) – HBO	Mandi Dillin
Outstanding Locations in Period Television	• SEE (season 3) – Apple TV+	John Rakich, Keith Park
Outstanding Locations in Period Television	• Westworld (season 4) – HBO	Jennifer Dunne, Mike Haro
Outstanding Locations in Limited Anthology Television	**The White Lotus (Season 2) – HBO**	**Piernicola Pinnola**
Outstanding Locations in Limited Anthology Television	• A Spy Among Friends – Amazon	Charlotte Wright, Flora Kinch Waugh, Lucian Asan
Outstanding Locations in Limited Anthology Television	• Daisy Jones & the Six – Amazon	Jay Traynor, Batou Chandler, Mandi Dillin, Giannis Dimitras, Giorgos Maravas, Joshua Persky
Outstanding Locations in Limited Anthology Television	• Queen Charlotte - Netflix	Tony Hood
Outstanding Locations in Limited Anthology Television	• White House Plumbers – HBO	Steve Grivno, Peggy Pridemore, Tada C.H. Chae
Outstanding Locations in a Commercial	**Icelandair, "Easy to Stop, Hard to Leave" - Somesuch**	**Jón Ólafur Lindsay**
Outstanding Locations in a Commercial	• AirPods Pro, "Quiet the Noise" - Megaforce	Hernan Dal Maso, Jose Varamo
Outstanding Locations in a Commercial	• Apple, "The Greatest" - Somesuch	Nick Morley, Ivan Siebel
Outstanding Locations in a Commercial	• Go RVing Canada, "You Are Out There" - BHLA	Jason Nolan, Ryan Leedu
Outstanding Locations in a Commercial	• Visit California, "Kidifornia Family Vacation" - The Shipyard	Weston Marsh
Outstanding Film Commission	**Alberta Film Commissions/Calgary Economic Development** **"The Last of Us"**	**Luke Azevedo**
Outstanding Film Commission	• City of Brantford, Ontario "The Handmaid’s Tale"	Kevin Dekok
Outstanding Film Commission	• Worcester, MA Film Commission "Wakanda Forever"	Edgar Luna
Outstanding Film Commission	• Czech Film Commission "The Gray Man"	Pavlina Zipkova
Outstanding Film Commission	• Montana Film Office "1923"	Allison Whitmer
Outstanding Film Commission	• Oklahoma Film + Music Office "Reservation Dogs"	Jeanette Stanton

LMGI Honorary Awards
Lifetime Achievement Award	Trailblazer Award
**Dow Griffith**	**Beth Tate**
Humanitarian Award	Eva Monley Award
**Creative Coalition**	**Steven Spielberg**

=== 2022 ===
Date: August 27, 2022
Location: Los Angeles Center Studios
Host: Melissa Peterman
Notable Guests: James Cromwell, Alexis Floyd, Amy Hill, Kate Linder, and Paul Scheer

LMGI Award for Outstanding use of Locations
Award	Project	Recipient
Outstanding Locations in a Contemporary Film	• **No Time to Die – MGM**	**Charlie Hayes, Mandy Sharpe, Ben Piltz, Matthew Clarke, Duncan Broadfoot**
Outstanding Locations in a Contemporary Film	• CODA - Apple TV+	Tim Gorman
Outstanding Locations in a Contemporary Film	• Drive My Car - Bitters End/Janus Films	Satoko Nakagawa
Outstanding Locations in a Contemporary Film	• Everything Everywhere All at Once - A24	Kelly Stuart
Outstanding Locations in a Contemporary Film	• In the Heights – Warner Bros	Samson Jacobson
Outstanding Locations in a Contemporary Film	• Top Gun: Maverick - Paramount	Mike Fantasia, Lori Balton
Outstanding Locations in a Period Film	• **House of Gucci - MGM**	**Elisabetta Tomasso, Piernicola (Betta) Pinnola**
Outstanding Locations in a Period Film	• Licorice Pizza – MGM/Focus Features	Michael Glaser
Outstanding Locations in a Period Film	• Last Night in Soho – Universal/Focus Features	Camilla Stephenson, Cat Ho
Outstanding Locations in a Period Film	• The Northman - Universal/Focus Features	Naomi Liston, Gordon Wycherley, Thor Kjartansson
Outstanding Locations in a Period Film	• The Power of the Dog – Netflix	Sally Sherratt
Outstanding Locations in Contemporary Television	• **Succession (season 3) – HBO**	**Paul Eskenazi, Enrico Latella**
Outstanding Locations in Contemporary Television	• Atlanta (season 3) – FX Networks	Ian Hutchinson, Rehya D Young, Kevin Dowling, Chris Kennedy, Maarten Buurlage, Benjamin Hendriks, Pascal Ricuort, Jen Farris
Outstanding Locations in Contemporary Television	• Better Call Saul (season 6) – AMC	Christian Diaz de Bedoya, Kyle Kernan, Dwight Harrison
Outstanding Locations in Contemporary Television	• Reservation Dogs – FX Networks	Chris Kucharski, Shane Brown
Outstanding Locations in Contemporary Television	• Yellowstone Season 4 – Paramount	Charlie Skinner, Dustin Daniels, David Zachary Heine
Outstanding Locations in Period Television	• **Stranger Things (season 4) – Netflix**	**Tony Holley, Kyle A. Carey, John Lucas, Jonas Spokas, Vytautas Riabovas**
Outstanding Locations in Period Television	• Bridgerton – Shondaland/Netflix	Tony Hood
Outstanding Locations in Period Television	• Narcos: Mexico – Gaumont/Netflix	Martin Corkidi, Horacio Sandoval
Outstanding Locations in Period Television	• Pachinko – Apple TV+	Bong Hoon Cho, Matt Palmer
Outstanding Locations in Period Television	• SEE (season 2) – Apple TV+	John Rakich, Keith Park
Outstanding Locations in Period Television	• The Marvelous Mrs. Maisel (season 4) – Amazon Studios	Amanda Foley-Burbank, Jose Guerrero
Outstanding Locations in Limited Anthology Television	• **Station Eleven – HBO Max**	**Srdjan Vilotijevic, Elmer Jones, Stefan Nikolov, Stuart Berberich**
Outstanding Locations in Limited Anthology Television	• Dopesick – Hulu	Nancy Haecker, Madeline Bell, Cassandra McCarthy
Outstanding Locations in Limited Anthology Television	• Inventing Anna – Shondaland/Netflix	Kristin Dombroski, John Cefalu, Youssef Abbagourram, Markus Bensch, Damon Gordon, Maya Reid
Outstanding Locations in Limited Anthology Television	• The First Lady – Showtime	Matthew B. Chamberlin, Mela Rayne, Renee Brock
Outstanding Locations in Limited Anthology Television	• The Tourist – All3Media/BBC Studios	Sarah Abbey, Mark Evans, Maria Humphreys, Scott McCarten
Outstanding Locations in Limited Anthology Television	• Under the Banner of Heaven – FX Networks	Matt Palmer, Mike Johansen
Outstanding Locations in a Commercial	• **Crown Royal, "Kickoff with Crown" - Love Song**	**Caprice Ericson**
Outstanding Locations in a Commercial	• Hyundai Ioniq 5, "Spiderman: Only Way Home"; Park Pictures	Leo Fialho, Nate Taylor, Chris Allen, Kyle Kaufman
Outstanding Locations in a Commercial	• OHRA, "Sleeping with the Fishes" - Holy Fools	Thijs Bolle, Tjarco Van Wijck
Outstanding Locations in a Commercial	• Renault, "From Horses" - Publicis Conseil	Hernan Dal Maso, Jose Varamo, Ana Luisa Millot
Outstanding Locations in a Commercial	• Rolls-Royce Black Badge, "Embrace the Night" - Rankin	Dan Connolly
Outstanding Film Commission	• **Oklahoma Film & Music Office - "Reservation Dogs"**	**Tava Maloy Sofsky**
Outstanding Film Commission	• City of Brantford, Ontario - "The Handmaid’s Tale"	Kevin Dekok
Outstanding Film Commission	• City of Kingston, Ontario - "The Mayor of Kingstown"	Alex Jansen
Outstanding Film Commission	• Hawaii Film Office - "The White Lotus"	Donne Dawson and Tracy Bennett
Outstanding Film Commission	• Jamaica Promotions Corporation - "No Time to Die"	Renee Robinson
Outstanding Film Commission	• Royal Film Commission – Jordan - "Zara Man"	Justin Cooper

LMGI Honorary Awards
Lifetime Achievement Award	Trailblazer Award
**John Panzarella**	**Red Nation Celebration Institute**
Humanitarian Award	Eva Monley Award
**Orlando Bloom**	**Martin Scorsese**

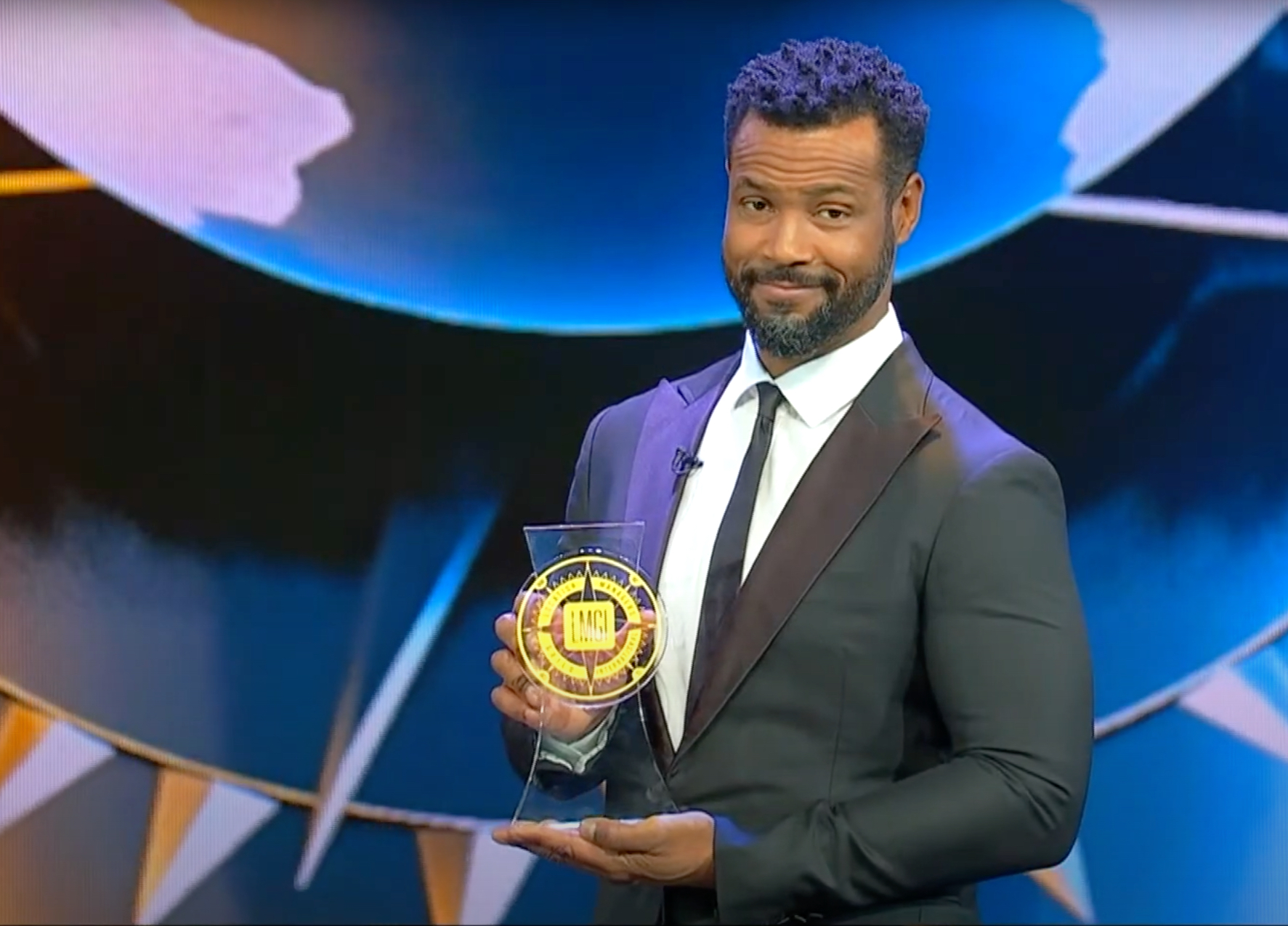
Host Isaiah Mustafa with the current LMGI award in 2021

=== 2021 ===
Date: October 23, 2021
Location: (Held virtually due to the COVID-19 pandemic)
Host: Isaiah Mustafa
Notable Guests: actors John Brotherton, Jim Cashman, Joel de la Fuente, Lesley Fera, Chris Geere, Aimee La Joie, Harry Lennix, Camryn Manheim, Jon Seda, and Nadine Velazquez

LMGI Award for Outstanding use of Locations
Award	Project	Recipient
Outstanding Locations in a Contemporary Film	**Tenet - Warner Bros**	**Janice Polley, Julie Hannum, Klaus Darrelman**
Outstanding Locations in a Contemporary Film	• Black Is King - Disney	Jason Wisch, Vincent Vanni
Outstanding Locations in a Contemporary Film	• Concrete Cowboy - Netflix	Christopher Gormley, Staci Hagenbaugh
Outstanding Locations in a Contemporary Film	• Nomadland – Searchlight	Nathan D. Harrison
Outstanding Locations in a Contemporary Film	• A Quiet Place Part II - Paramount	Mara Alcaly, Joe Mullaney, John Hutchinson
Outstanding Locations in a Period Film	**Judas and the Black Messiah - Warner Bros**	**Bill Garvey, Tim Kanieski**
Outstanding Locations in a Period Film	• Dreamland – Paramount	Ashley Valdez, Clay DeVelvis
Outstanding Locations in a Period Film	• Enola Holmes – Netflix	Bill Darby, Jess MacDonald
Outstanding Locations in a Period Film	• Mank - Netflix	William Doyle, Walter Roshetski
Outstanding Locations in a Period Film	• The Trial of the Chicago 7 – Netflix	Nick Rafferty, Dennis Vozkov
Outstanding Locations in Contemporary Television	**Lupin – Netflix**	**Thomas De Sambi, Valerie Segond**
Outstanding Locations in Contemporary Television	• The Handmaid’s Tale – Hulu	Anne Richardson, Jeremy Pinard
Outstanding Locations in Contemporary Television	• The Mosquito Coast – Apple TV+	Eric Stangeland, Horacio Rodriguez, Bob Lepucki, Isaias Galicia Morales
Outstanding Locations in Contemporary Television	• Warrior Nun – Netflix	Tate Aráez, Kico Aráez
Outstanding Locations in Contemporary Television	• Woke – Hulu	Kent Sponagle, John Alexander
Outstanding Locations in Contemporary Television	• Yellowstone Season 3 – Paramount	Charlie Skinner, David Zachary Heine
Outstanding Locations in Period Television	**The Crown Season 4 – Netflix**	**Mark Walledge, Tate Aráez**
Outstanding Locations in Period Television	• Bridgerton – Netflix	Paul Tomlinson
Outstanding Locations in Period Television	• Fargo Season 4 – FX	Nick Rafferty
Outstanding Locations in Period Television	• The Nevers – HBO	Jethro Ensor, Elena Vakirtzis
Outstanding Locations in Period Television	• Ratched – Netflix	Robert Foulkes, Adam Robinson
Outstanding Locations in Period Television	• Snowfall – FX	Manny Padilla, James Gierman
Outstanding Locations in Limited Anthology Television	**The Queen’s Gambit – Netflix**	**David Pieper, Stefan Wöhleke, Matt Graver, Fred Kamping**
Outstanding Locations in Limited Anthology Television	• Halston – Netflix	Christopher Britton, Amanda Foley-Burbank
Outstanding Locations in Limited Anthology Television	• Mare of Easttown – HBO	Brian O’Neill
Outstanding Locations in Limited Anthology Television	• The Serpent – BBC	Poj Udomsong Aram, Thitikorn Sriborisut
Outstanding Locations in Limited Anthology Television	• The Stand – Paramount	Matt Palmer, Courtney Ashforth, Mitchell Gutman
Outstanding Locations in Limited Anthology Television	• The Underground Railroad – Amazon	Alison A. Taylor, Angie Morrison
Outstanding Locations in a Commercial	**Apple Watch - "It Already Does That" - MJZ**	**Matt DeLoach, Jof Hanwright, Brent Gaffan, Galidan Nauber**
Outstanding Locations in a Commercial	• Extra Gum, "For When It’s Time” – MJZ	Daniela Aguilera, Debi Castro, Carlos Cofré, Carlos Simón Santis
Outstanding Locations in a Commercial	• Fundacion Argentina de Trasplante Hepatico, "Match" – Primo	Hernan Dal Maso, Jose Varamo
Outstanding Locations in a Commercial	• Nike, “Play New" – Somesuch	Florian Schura, Michael Dennehy, Michael Fricke, Travis Diener, Steve Kovacic, Alistair Vlok
Outstanding Locations in a Commercial	• Sony, “Create the Beyond" – Hero Productions	Alfred Gislason, Gudfinnur Ymir Hardarson, Birkir Bibbi Grétarsson
Outstanding Film Commission	**Beth Nelson - Savannah Regional Film Commission**	**Underground Railroad**
Outstanding Film Commission	• Bath Film Office	Bridgerton
Outstanding Film Commission	• Estonian Film Institute/Film Estonia	Tenet
Outstanding Film Commission	• Hamilton Music and Film Office	Umbrella Academy
Outstanding Film Commission	• Liverpool Film Office	Tin Star: Liverpool
Outstanding Film Commission	• Screen Queensland Australia	Love and Monsters

LMGI Honorary Awards
Lifetime Achievement Award	Trailblazer Award
**Aine Furey**	**Patricia Fay**
Humanitarian Award	Eva Monley Award
**Marlee Matlin**	**David Yates**

=== 2020 ===
Date: October 24, 2020
Location: (Held virtually due to the COVID-19 pandemic)
Host: Isaiah Mustafa
Notable Guests: Director Edgar Wright, and actors Jim Cashman, Sylvia Hoeks, Damaris Lewis, Graham McTavish, Joe Mantegna, Blair Underwood, Tim Williams, Noah Wyle

LMGI Award for Outstanding use of Locations
Award	Project	Recipient
Outstanding Locations in a Contemporary Film	**The Last Black Man in San Francisco - A24**	**Daniel Lee**
Outstanding Locations in a Contemporary Film	• 6 Underground - Skydance Media/Netflix	Enrico Latella, Simon Crook
Outstanding Locations in a Contemporary Film	• Da 5 Bloods - 40 Acres and a Mule Filmworks/Netflix	Nui Voradet Emeam
Outstanding Locations in a Contemporary Film	• Extraction – Netflix	Mary Baltrop
Outstanding Locations in a Contemporary Film	• The Peanut Butter Falcon - Roadside Attractions	Jody Schiesser
Outstanding Locations in a Period Film	**Once Upon a Time in Hollywood - Columbia Pictures**	**Rick Schuler, Steve Mapel**
Outstanding Locations in a Period Film	• 1917 – DreamWorks Pictures	Emma Pill
Outstanding Locations in a Period Film	• Dolemite Is My Name – Netflix	David B Lyons, Russel Hadaya
Outstanding Locations in a Period Film	• A Hidden Life - Fox Searchlight Pictures	Markus Bensch, Leo Baumgartner
Outstanding Locations in a Period Film	• Jojo Rabbit – Fox Searchlight Pictures	Jan Adler
Outstanding Locations in a Period Film	• Little Women – Sony Pictures	Douglas Dresser, Kyle "Snappy" Oliver
Outstanding Locations in Contemporary Television	**Killing Eve – BBC America**	**Jamie Parsons, Jordi Utset, Lucian Asan**
Outstanding Locations in Contemporary Television	• Giri/Haji – BBC2/Netflix	Antonia Grant, Idris Ahmed, Tooru Hayakawa, Katsumasa Morita
Outstanding Locations in Contemporary Television	• Goliath – Amazon Studios	Scott Poole, Errol Reichow
Outstanding Locations in Contemporary Television	• Messiah – Netflix	Wendell Hinkle, Marco Giacalone, Hilton Clay Peres
Outstanding Locations in Contemporary Television	• Treadstone – USA Network	Imre Légmån
Outstanding Locations in Contemporary Television	• White Lines – Netflix	Germån Traver, Leon Seth
Outstanding Locations in Period Television	**Perry Mason – HBO**	**Jonathan Jansen, Alexander Georges, Brian Kinney, Alex Moreno**
Outstanding Locations in Period Television	• Babylon Berlin – Sky 1	David Pieper
Outstanding Locations in Period Television	• The Crown (season 3) – Netflix	Pat Karam, Pedro "Tate" Aråez
Outstanding Locations in Period Television	• See – Apple TV+	Trevor Brokop, Nick Bergstedt, Michael Gazetas
Outstanding Locations in Period Television	• Westworld (season 3) – HBO	Mandi Dillin, Michael Wesley
Outstanding Locations in Period Television	• Wu-Tang: An American Saga – Hulu	Rob Coleman, Mike Mizrahi, Dexter Wiseman
Outstanding Locations in Limited Anthology Television	**Little America – Apple TV+** (tie) **ZeroZeroZero – StudioCanal/Amazon Studios**	**Mike Hartel, Rocco Nisivoccia, Adrian Knight** (tie); **Gianni Antonio Grazioli, Christian Peritore, Juan Pablo Noval, Lily Flaschner, Virginia McCollam, Babacar Seck, Zoubir Belgsir, Hicham Jamaledine**
Outstanding Locations in Limited Anthology Television	• Belgravia – Epix	Mark "Sparky" Ellis
Outstanding Locations in Limited Anthology Television	• Catherine the Great – HBO	Vytautas Riabovas, Kestas Cicenasas, Svetlana Lukash
Outstanding Locations in Limited Anthology Television	• The Plot Against America – HBO	Matthew Kania
Outstanding Locations in Limited Anthology Television	• The Spy (TV series) – Netflix	Rabi El Bakki, Zsuzsa Gregua, Zsolt Valkony
Outstanding Locations in a Commercial	**"Mask of the Zodiac” - Stink Shanghai**	**Ben Qian, Allen Cao**
Outstanding Locations in a Commercial	• Ford, "Human Power" – Primo	Alejando Bresciani
Outstanding Locations in a Commercial	• Georgetown Optician, "Eyes Say More Than Words" – Design Army	Dean Alexander
Outstanding Locations in a Commercial	• Gucci, "Of Course A Horse" – GE Projects	Beau Bright
Outstanding Locations in a Commercial	• Renault Clio, "The French Exchange" – Academy Films	Mark Jones, Eugene Strange
Outstanding Locations in a Commercial	• Sprite, "You Are Not Alone" – Primo	Hernan Dal Maso
Outstanding Film Commission	**Toscana Film Commission**	**Stefania Ippoliti**
Outstanding Film Commission	• Abu Dhabi Film Commission	Jassim Al Nowais
Outstanding Film Commission	• Berlin Brandenburg Film Commission	Christiane Raab
Outstanding Film Commission	• The Municipality of Port Hope Marketing & Tourism Office	Kevin Narraway
Outstanding Film Commission	• New Jersey Motion Picture & Television Commission	Michael Uslan

LMGI Honorary Awards
Lifetime Achievement Award	Trailblazer Award
**Veronique Vowell**	**Spike Lee**
Humanitarian Award	Eva Monley Award
**Gary Sinise**	**Christopher McQuarrie**

=== 2019 ===
Date: September 21, 2019
Location: The Eli & Edythe Broad Stage at SMC Performing Arts Center, Santa Monica, CA
Host: AJ Gibson
Notable Guests: Director Claire Scanlon, producer Duncan Henderson, actors Michael Ealy, Regina King, Joe Mantegna, Holland Taylor

LMGI Award for Outstanding use of Locations
Award	Project	Recipient
Outstanding Locations in a Contemporary Film	**Mission: Impossible – Fallout – Paramount Pictures**	**David Campbell-Bell, Ben Plitz**
Outstanding Locations in a Contemporary Film	• Crazy Rich Asians – Warner Bros.	Guy Sahibjahn
Outstanding Locations in a Contemporary Film	• The Girl in the Spider's Web – Sony Pictures	Klaus Grosse Darrelmann
Outstanding Locations in a Contemporary Film	• John Wick: Parabellum – Summit Entertainment	Gayle Vangrofsky
Outstanding Locations in a Contemporary Film	• The Man Who Killed Don Quixote – Screen Media	Ana Ibañez
Outstanding Locations in a Period Film	**Roma – Netflix**	**Claudia Puebla Monge, Horacio Rodriguez de Zamacona**
Outstanding Locations in a Period Film	• BlacKkKlansman – Focus Features	Tim Stacker
Outstanding Locations in a Period Film	• Cold War – Amazon Studios	Bartosz Bednarz, Michal Sliwkiewicz
Outstanding Locations in a Period Film	• The Favourite – Fox Searchlight Pictures	Daragh Coghlan, Adam Richards
Outstanding Locations in a Period Film	• The Highwaymen – Netflix	Ed Lipscomb
Outstanding Locations in Contemporary Television	**Jack Ryan – Amazon Prime Video**	**Lori Balton, Arnaud Kaiser, Christian McWilliams, Peggy Pridemore, Michele St-Arnaud**
Outstanding Locations in Contemporary Television	• Killing Eve – BBC America	Casper Mills
Outstanding Locations in Contemporary Television	• Mayans M.C. – FX Networks	Dan Cooley
Outstanding Locations in Contemporary Television	• Mystery Road – Australian Broadcasting Corporation	Brett Dowson, Hugo Cran (Scout)
Outstanding Locations in Contemporary Television	• The OA – Netflix	Alexander Georges, Jonathan Jansen
Outstanding Locations in Contemporary Television	• The Widow – Amazon Prime Video	Neville Botha, Gary Sinclair
Outstanding Locations in Period Television	**Chernobyl – HBO**	**Jonas Spokas**
Outstanding Locations in Period Television	• The Assassination of Gianni Versace – FX Networks	Diane Friedman, Bob Lepucki, Leah Sokolowsky
Outstanding Locations in Period Television	• Game of Thrones – HBO	Robbie Boake
Outstanding Locations in Period Television	• The Man in the High Castle – Amazon Prime Video	Nicole Noelle Chartrand, Braden Jennings
Outstanding Locations in Period Television	• The Marvelous Mrs. Maisel – Amazon Prime Video	Amanda Foley Burbank, Jose Guerrero
Outstanding Locations in Period Television	• Westworld – HBO	Mandi Dillin
Outstanding Locations in a Commercial	**National Geographic, "Nujeen Mustafa" – 72andSunny**	**Jose Aragao, Luis Santos**
Outstanding Locations in a Commercial	• Huawei P20, "Gal Gadot" – Hero Productions Iceland	Alfred Gislason
Outstanding Locations in a Commercial	• Nike, "Dream Crazy" – Park Pictures	Jof Hanwright, Chris Gutierez
Outstanding Locations in a Commercial	• Penny, "Organic Food for All" – Film GmbH, Emote Productions	Kristina Markovic, Sanela Spajic
Outstanding Locations in a Commercial	• South Indian Bank, "Trust" – Panda Films	Chad Ozturk
Outstanding Film Commission	**Mission: Impossible – Fallout**	**KJ Jennings - Film Otago Southland**
Outstanding Film Commission	• The First Purge	Tim Clark - Buffalo Niagara Film Commission
Outstanding Film Commission	• The Handmaid's Tale	Devon Hogue - City of Cambridge Film Commission
Outstanding Film Commission	• A Wrinkle in Time	Cassandra Hesseltine - Humboldt-Del Norte Film Commission
Outstanding Film Commission	• Pacific Rim: Uprising	Matt Carol - Screen New South Wales

LMGI Honorary Awards
Lifetime Achievement Award	Trailblazer Award
**Michael J Meehan**	Not Awarded
Humanitarian Award	Eva Monley Award
**Hidden Empire Film Group**; Robert F. Smith, Deon Taylor, Roxanne Taylor	**Peter Weir**

=== 2018 ===
Date: April 7, 2018
Location: Alex Theatre, Glendale, CA
Host: Jonah Ray
Notable Guests: Writer Laeta Kalogridis, actors Kevin Daniels, Dennis Haysbert, Tracie Thoms

LMGI Award for Outstanding use of Locations
Outstanding Locations in Contemporary Film	Outstanding Locations in Period Film
**Baby Driver – Doug Dresser, Kyle Hinshaw**: The Florida Project – Stacey McGillis; Lady Bird – Michael Smith; Logan – Maria Bierniak; Three Billboards Outside Ebbing, Missouri – Robert Foulkes	**Dunkirk – Ben Piltz, Arnaud Kaiser**: All the Money in the World – Steve Mortimore, Enrico Latella; American Made – Michael Burmeister, Michael Haro; Atomic Blonde – Bea Beliczai, Klaus Darrelmann; Mudbound – Wise Wolfe, Imre Legman; Phantom Thread – Jason Wheeler
Outstanding Locations in Contemporary Television	Outstanding Locations in Period Television
**Ozark – Wes Hagan, Kevin Dowling**: Big Little Lies – Greg Alpert; Black Mirror: Arkangel – Malcolm McCulloch; Fargo – Robert Hilton; The Handmaid's Tale – John Musikka, Geoffrey Smither	**Game of Thrones – Robert Boake, Matt Jones, Pedro Tate Araez**: The Crown – Pat Karam and Robert Bentley; The Deuce – Chris George, Pat Weber Sones; The Marvelous Mrs. Maisel – Amanda Foley-Burbank, Jose Guerrero; Stranger Things – Tony Holley, Kyle Carey; Taboo – Tom Howard
Outstanding Locations in a Commercial	Outstanding Film Commission
**Volkswagen "Atlas" – Charlie Love, Jof Hanwright, John Hutchinson**: Coca-Cola – Doug Dresser, Stephenson Crossley, Charles Furer; Nike "Equality" – Jenny Caloca, Wilson Wu, Kathy Ruggeri; North Face "Ventrix" – Beth Melnick, Don Baldwin, Cristobal Fleischmann; Richmond Tourism BC – Christian Laub, David Angelski	**Atlanta Mayor's Office of Film and Entertainment**: Film LA; New Mexico Film Office; Visit Sacramento; Vietnam Cinema Department
LMGI Honorary Awards
Lifetime Achievement Award	Trailblazer Award
**Rino Pace**	**Josh Karan**
Humanitarian Award	Eva Monley Award
Not Awarded	Not Awarded

=== 2017 ===
Date: April 8, 2017
Location: Steven J Ross Theater, Warner Bros. Studios, Burbank, CA
Host: Rico Gagliano
Notable Guests: Directors Joe Pytka and Brad Silberling, author Michael Connelly, actors Amir Talai and Katherine Von Till

LMGI Award for Outstanding use of Locations
Outstanding Locations in Contemporary Film	Outstanding Locations in Period Film
**La La Land – Robert Foulkes and Steve Beimler**: Hell or High Water – Jonathan Slator and Erik Keeling-Torrez; Jason Bourne – Chris Moore and Peter Martorano; Lion – Hugo Cran, Sandeep Rudra and Harsh Dave; Manchester by the Sea – Kai Quinlan and Alex Berard	**Hidden Figures – Wes Hagan and Dan Gorman**: Hacksaw Ridge – Edward Donovan; Hail, Caesar! – John Panzarella and Leslie Thorson; Live by Night – JJ Hook and Laura Bryant; Rogue One: A Star Wars Story – Mark Somner and David O'Reilly
Outstanding Locations in Contemporary Television	Outstanding Locations in Period Television
**The Night Manager – Tom Howard and Daniel Sampedro Palerm**: The Affair – Sean Ilnseher; Better Call Saul – Christian Diaz de Bedoya; Bosch – Robert Paulsen and Paul Schreiber; Goliath – Jason Kaplon and Mike Barry; Scandal – Veronique Vowell	**The Crown – Pat Karam and Robert Bentley** (tie); **Westworld – Mandi Dillin** (tie): Game of Thrones – Matt Jones and Naomi Liston; The Man in the High Castle – Nicole Noelle Chartrand, Robert Murdoch; Stranger Things – Tony Holley
Outstanding Locations in a Commercial	Outstanding Film Commission
**MacBook Pro "Bulbs" – David Doumeng and Charlie Love** (tie); **Johnnie Walker "This Land is Your Land" – JJ Levine, Will Brewster, Patrick Burn, Dana Hanby** (tie): Visa "The Carpool to Rio" – Heather Haase, Ron Shino, Johnny Catrolli, Rob Darwin; O Organics "Rally" – Byll Williams and Phil Kane; Donate Life PSA "World's Biggest A-hole" – Galidan Nauber and Cale Hanks	**Royal Film Commission Jordan – Rogue One**: Creative Scotland – The BFG; Nevada Film Office – Jason Bourne; New Mexico Film Office – Hell or High Water; New York State Governor's Office of Motion Picture Development – The Girl on the Train
LMGI Honorary Awards
Lifetime Achievement Award	Trailblazer Award
**Stuart Raven Barter**	**Lori Balton**
Humanitarian Award	Eva Monley Award
Not Awarded	**Danny Boyle**

=== 2016 ===
Date: April 23, 2016
Location: Alex Theatre, Glendale, CA
Host: David Doumeng (2014 LMGA Award recipient)
Notable Guests: Directors Christopher Guest and Michael Mann, actors Jeff Goldblum, Tony Revolori, Milana Vayntrub

LMGI Award for Outstanding use of Locations
Outstanding Locations in Contemporary Film	Outstanding Locations in Period Film
**Sicario – S Todd Christensen and Shani Orona**; Blackhat – Janice Polley and Julie Hannum; Black Mass – Charlie Harrington and Benjamin Dewey; Creed – Patricia Taggart and Dan Gorman; Our Brand Is Crisis – Batou Chandler and Luis Estrella	**The Revenant – Robin Mounsey and Bruce Brownstein**; Bridge of Spies – Klaus Darrelmann and Markus Bensch; Mad Max: Fury Road – Simon Crook and Paul Tomlinson; Straight Outta Compton – Alison A Taylor; Trumbo – David Thornsberry
Outstanding Locations in Contemporary Television	Outstanding Locations in Period Television
**Sense8 – Marco Giacalone and Bill Bowling**; Bosch – Robert Paulsen and Paul Schreiber; Better Call Saul – Christian Diaz de Bedoya; Mr. Robot - Demian Resnick; True Detective – Michael Chickey and Caleb Duffy	**Game of Thrones – Robert Boake and Pedro Tate Araez**; Aquarius – Michael Haro and Stacey Brashear; Fargo – Matt Palmer and Rob Hilton; Gotham – Keith Adams and Pat Sones; Sleepy Hollow – Nancy Haecker and Ryan Taylor
Outstanding Locations in a Commercial	Outstanding Film Commission
**Chevrolet "Chevy Anthem" – Sean Alquist, Jikesh Shah**; Apple "History of Sound" – Peter Orth, David Henriksen and David McKinney; Budweiser "Lost Dog" – Patrick Riley; Facebook "Friend Request" – Adam Butt and Wilson Wu; Toyota "Let's Go Places" – Scott Logan and Scott Trimble	**Film LA**; Albuquerque Film Commission; Berlin Brandenburg Film Commission; Comisión de Filmaciones de la Ciudad de México; Royal Film Commission of Jordan
LMGI Honorary Awards
Lifetime Achievement Award	Trailblazer Award
**Janice Polley**	**Steve Dayan**
Humanitarian Award	Eva Monley Award
**Amy Brenneman and Brad Silberling**	**Wes Anderson**

=== 2015 ===
Date: March 7, 2015
Location: Wallis Annenberg Center for the Performing Arts, Beverly Hills, CA
Host: David Doumeng (2014 LMGA Award recipient)
Notable Guests: Debbie Allen, Tony Denison, Ted Lange, Alfre Woodard

LMGA Award for Outstanding use of Locations
Outstanding Locations in Contemporary Film	Outstanding Locations in Period Film
**Wild – Nancy Haecker**; Chef – Kei Rowan-Young; Gone Girl – Rick Schuler and Steve Mapel; Nightcrawler – Curtis Collins and Mike Brewer; The Gambler – Chris Baugh	**The Grand Budapest Hotel – Klaus Darrelmann**; Fury – Russell Lodge and Lee Robertson; Inherent Vice – Larry Ring and Scott Fitzgerald; Selma – Wes Hagen and Leif Tilden; The Imitation Game – David Broder and Richard George
Outstanding Locations in Contemporary Television	Outstanding Locations in Period Television
**True Detective – Batou Chandler**; Homeland – Robert Bentley and Deon du Preez; Nashville – Kristi Frankenheimer and Mark Ragland; NCIS: Los Angeles – Tony Salome and Jason Savage; Ray Donovan – Craig van Gundy and Boyd Wilson	**Boardwalk Empire – Amanda Foley and Audra Gorman**; American Horror Story – John Johnson; Forever – Guy Efrat; Turn: Washington's Spies – Tom Trigo and Becky Beckstoffer
Outstanding Locations in a Single Commercial	Outstanding Locations in a Commercial Campaign
**Coca-Cola, "America is Beautiful" – Jimmy Ayoub, Cindy McCrossen, Peter Orth, Stephen Pherigo**; Budweiser "Always There" – JJ Levine and Byll Williams; Nissan "Fly by Night" – Gil Evans, Marie-Paule Goislard, Beth Tate; Nissan Altima "Migration" – Crofton Diack and Mike Floyd; Honda Civic "Today is Pretty Great" – Jof Hanwright, Jesse Rivard	**"Ram Trucks" – David McKinney and Peter Orth**; "Subaru Outback" – Alissa Desler and Lori Allen
Outstanding Film Commission
**Long Beach Office of Special Events and Filming**; Chicago Film Office; Film in Iceland; Oregon Governor's Office of Film & Television; Royal Film Commission of Jordan
LMGA Honorary Awards
Lifetime Achievement Award	Trailblazer Award
**Kokayi Ampah**	**Marino Pascal**
Humanitarian Award	Eva Monley Award
**Caroline Baron – FilmAid International**	Not Awarded

=== 2014 ===
Date: March 29, 2014
Location: Writers Guild Theater, Beverly Hills, CA
Host: Jamie Kaler
Notable Guests: AMPAS President Cheryl Boone Isaacs, actors Shari Belafonte, Billy Crystal, Kate Linder

LMGA Award for Outstanding Achievement by a Location Professional
Outstanding Achievement in Television	Outstanding Achievement in Feature Film
**Robert Boake – Game of Thrones**; Patrick Burn – House of Cards; Christian Diaz de Bedoya – Breaking Bad; Caleb Duffy – Behind the Candelabra	**Ilt Jones – Iron Man 3**; John Latenser V – Nebraska; Rick Schuler and Steve Mapel – Her; Andrew Ullman and Lori Balton – Saving Mr. Banks; David Velasco – American Hustle
Outstanding Achievement in Commercials	Outstanding Film Commission
**David Doumeng and Charlie Love – "Nike"**; Dale Dreher – "America's Got Talent"; Kent Matsuoka – "Mountain Dew"; Barbara Miller – "Optimum"; Byll Williams and JJ Levine – "Gatorade"	**Albuquerque Film Commission – Breaking Bad**; Film in Iceland – The Secret Life of Walter Mitty; Film LA – NCIS: Los Angeles; Long Beach Film Commission – Dexter; South Pasadena Film Commission – Dexter
LMGA Award for Outstanding use of Locations
Outstanding Locations in Television	Outstanding Locations in Feature Film
**Game of Thrones**; Breaking Bad; House of Cards; NCIS: Los Angeles	**The Secret Life of Walter Mitty**; American Hustle; Fruitvale Station; Nebraska; Philomena
LMGA Honorary Awards
Lifetime Achievement Award	Trailblazer Award
**Scott Dewees**	**Sheri Davis**
Humanitarian Award	Eva Monley Award
**Haskell Wexler**	**Alexander Payne**

== List of multiple winners and nominees ==
The following list is arranged by number of wins, nominations, and last name in order of preference (current as of November 2020) :

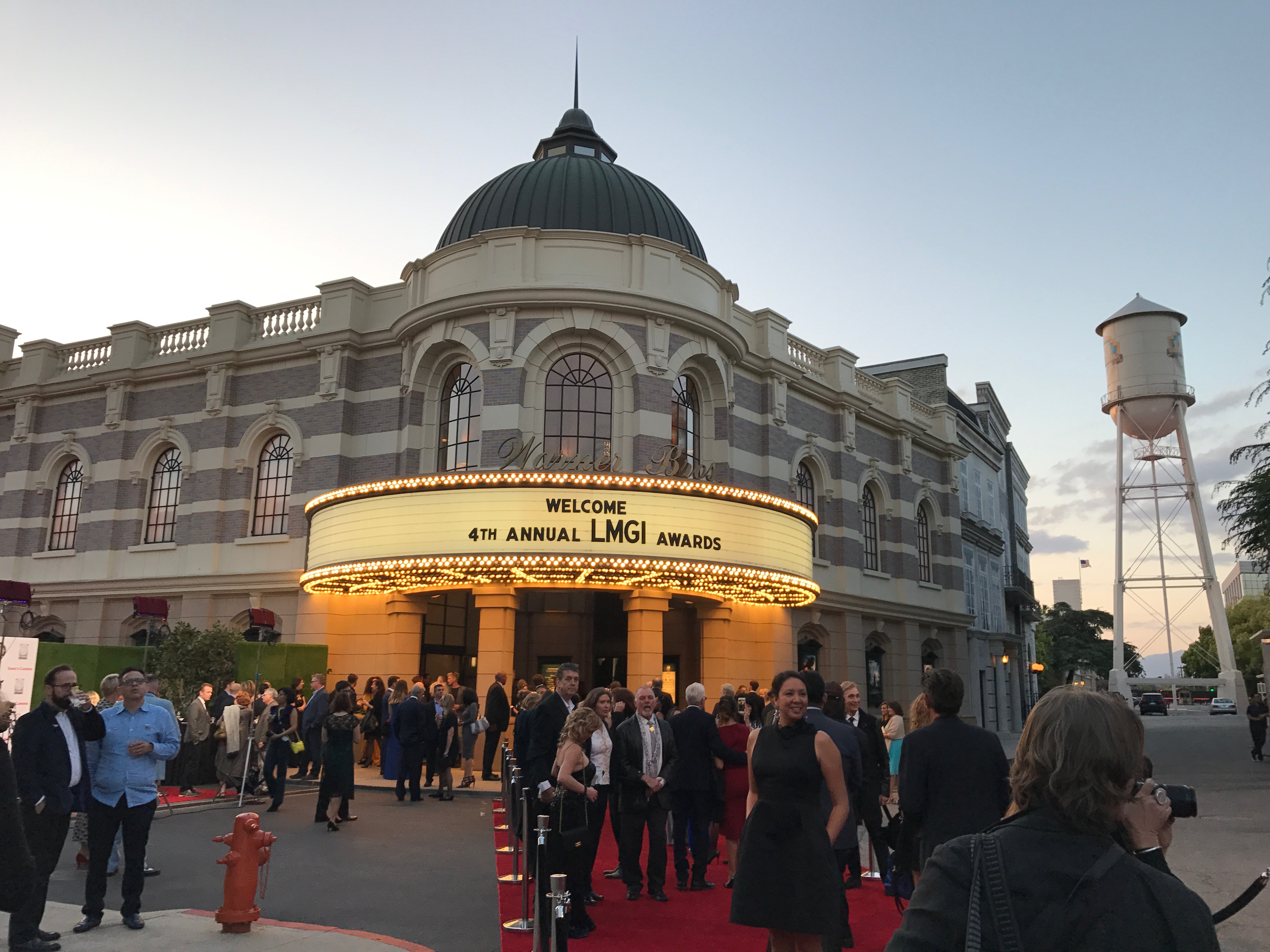
The 4th Annual LMGI Awards were held on the historic Warner Bros backlot

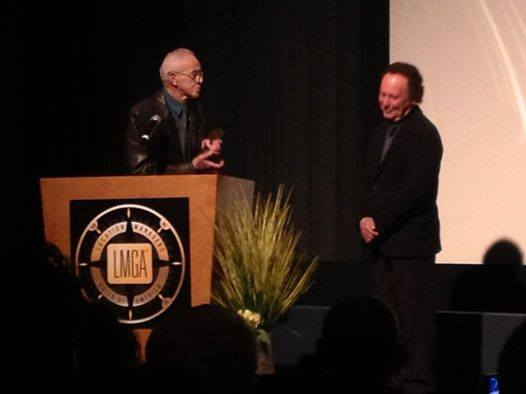
Billy Crystal presents Haskell Wexler the 2014 LMGA Humanitarian Award

3+ Location Manager Wins

- Robert Boake (3 wins, 4 nominations)
- Charlie Love (3 wins, 3 nominations)
- Pedro Tate Araez (3 wins, 4 nominations)
- Ben Piltz (3 wins, 3 nominations)

2+ Location Manager Wins

- Wes Hagen (2 wins, 3 nominations)
- Peter Orth (2 wins, 3 nominations)
- David Doumeng (2 wins, 2 nominations)
- Klaus Darrelman (2 win, 5 nominations)

3+ Location Manager Nominations

- Robert Bentley (1 win, 3 nominations)
- Amanda Foley-Burbank (1 win, 3 nominations)
- Mandi Dillin (1 win, 3 nominations)
- Doug Dresser (1 win, 3 nominations)
- Jof Hanwright (1 win, 3 nominations)
- Pat Karam (1 win, 3 nominations)
- JJ Levine (1 win, 3 nominations)
- Steve Mapel (1 win, 3 nominations)
- Rick Schuler (1 win, 3 nominations)
- Christian Diaz de Bedoya (3 nominations)
- Byll Williams (3 nominations)
- Matt Palmer (4 nominations)

3+ Television Series Wins

- Game of Thrones (4 wins, 6 nominations)

2+ Television Series Nominations

- The Crown (2 win, 4 nominations)
- Westworld (1 win, 3 nominations)
- Killing Eve (1 win, 2 nominations)
- True Detective (1 win, 2 nominations)
- Breaking Bad (2 nominations)
- Better Call Saul (2 nominations)
- Bosch (2 nominations)
- Fargo (2 nominations)
- Goliath (2 nominations)
- House of Cards (2 nominations)
- Man in the High Castle (2 nominations)
- The Marvelous Mrs Maisel (2 nominations)
- NCIS: Los Angeles (2 nominations)
- Stranger Things (2 nominations)

Wins by Network/Studio

- HBO (9 wins, 19 nominations)
- Netflix (5 wins, 22 nominations)
- Fox/Searchlight/FX (5 wins, 16 nominations)
- Amazon (2 wins, 13 nominations)
- Sony/Columbia (2 wins, 10 nominations)
- BBC (2 wins, 5 nominations)
- Lionsgate (2 wins, 4 nominations)
- Warner Brothers (1 win, 10 nominations)
- AMC (1 win, 7 nominations)
- Paramount (1 win, 5 nominations)
- A24 (1 win, 2 nominations)
- Apple TV+ (1 win, 2 nominations)
- Marvel (1 win, 2 nominations)

2+ Film Commission Nominations

- Royal Film Commission of Jordan (1 win, 3 nominations)
- Film LA (1 win, 3 nominations)
- Albuquerque Film Commission (1 win, 2 nominations)
- Long Beach Film Commission (1 win, 2 nominations)
- Film in Iceland (2 nominations)
- New Mexico Film Commission (2 nominations)
