= Location manager =

Person responsible for locations where a movie is shot

Film shooting on location in Downtown Los Angeles

The location manager is a member of the film crew responsible for finding and securing locations to be used, obtaining all fire, police and other governmental permits, and coordinating the logistics for the production to complete its work. They are also the public face of the production, and responsible for addressing issues that arise due to the production's impact on the community.

== Duties ==
Historically, the duties of the Location Manager were the responsibility of the Assistant Director. As the film industry grew, a need was identified for greater oversight, to allow ADs to focus on the internal aspects of the set. A dedicated person focusing on external influences was first seen in the 1950s on large studio features, and became common in the industry by the late 1970s.

The first job of a location manager is managing the location scouting of a project, usually supervising several scouts and assistant managers during the course of a show. A location manager will work closely with the director and the production designer during preproduction to find and secure their creative vision, and oversee additional scouts to insure that all scripted locations are accounted for. The manager is also responsible for public relations at the locations used, and the safety of the crew during filming.

A "location scout" is responsible for the initial scouting of all the locations used in a film, and translates the writer and director's vision for the feel of the scene into a viable and appropriate location. An experienced location scout will take into account all the logistics necessary for the production to function.

Some items that a location scout must be aware of before submitting a location for approval are the budgetary restrictions of the production, local permitting fees and regulations, camera and lighting requirements, convenience to other locations, production services, crew and unit parking, and possibly incidental issues such as direction of the sun, traffic in and around the location, aircraft flight paths, weather patterns, road work, demonstrations, and even interest by local organized crime families.

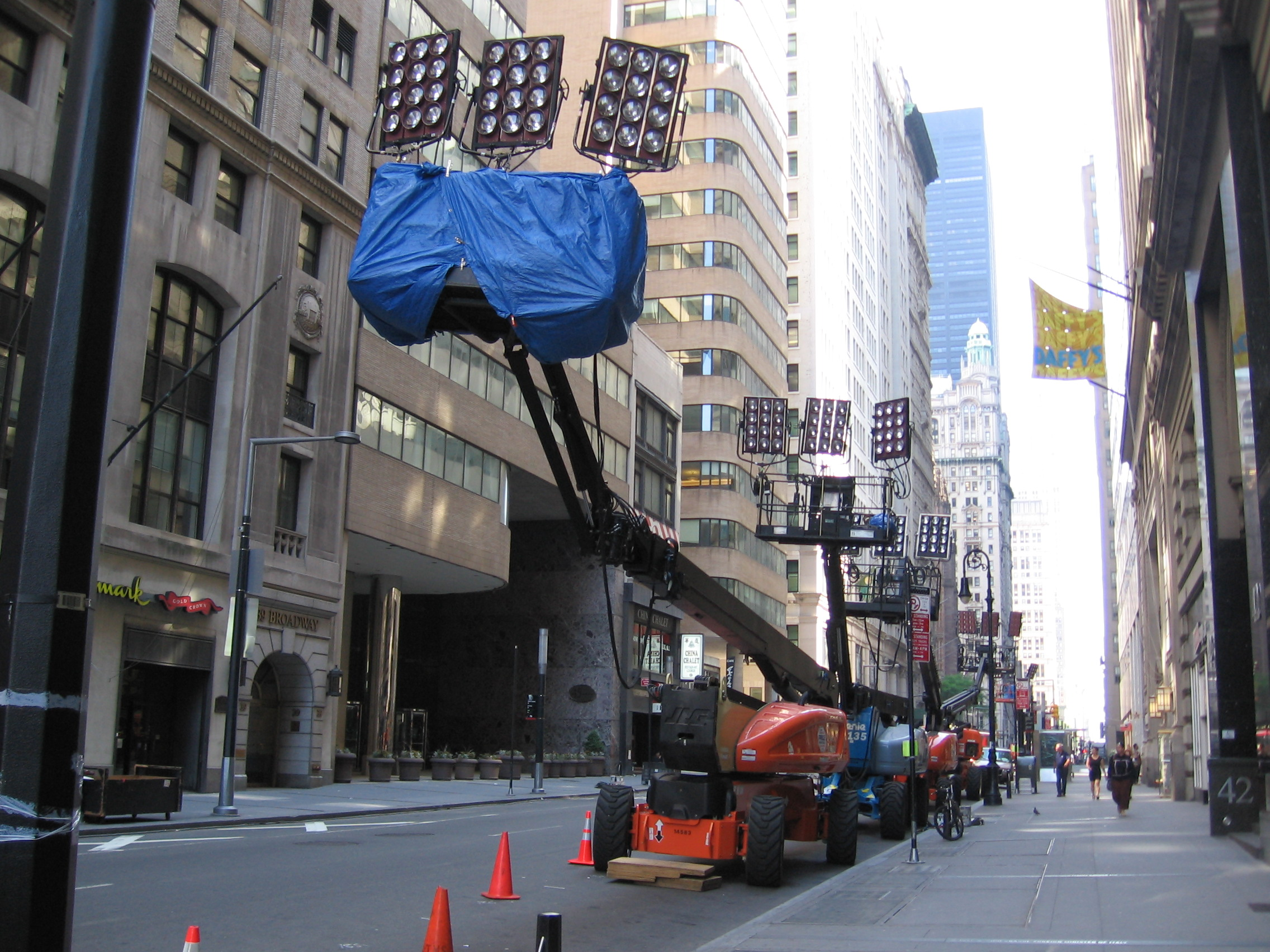
Large lighting equipment must be stored between shoots. For The Sorcerer's Apprentice, the storage spot was lower Broadway in Manhattan

Once a location has been determined to have the appropriate appearance, the location manager must schedule dates for preparation, wrap and strike, and negotiate with the property owner an appropriate fee as well as fees to neighbors and tenants that may be impacted by production. The location manager will also apply for the necessary permits through the local municipality and/or community and housing associations, arrange parking for trucks, equipment and crew, prepare temporary facilities for holding production, talent, crew and meals, and ensuring the security of the location, the safety of the crew while minimizing the impact to the surrounding community.

Good location managers are well-poised and able to think on their feet as they are constantly moving, usually preceding production at a location, and overseeing final strike and wrap. They are the first and last people the public sees that represent the production, and are responsible for ensuring that the location is returned to the condition in which it was received. The location manager is also to be aware of the possible copyright issues which may be an issue if the show is filmed in a public place where there is art work or such, and where the artist has to give consent to the creation being depicted or covered or replaced by other artwork.

They need to be aware of the production's needs and know how to best accommodate them while diplomatically ensuring that the requirements of all parties, from the property owners, line producer, director and production designer, to the grip and electric teams lighting and rigging the set, and their teamster brothers with their trucks, trailers and vans.

== Employment ==
In Hollywood, they are represented by the International Brotherhood of Teamsters Local 399, and in New York and Chicago they are represented by the Directors Guild of America (DGA) for features and television work. In New York Commercials, they are represented by Teamsters Local 817. In Pittsburgh, Location Managers are represented by Teamsters Local 249. In Georgia, Location Managers are represented by the Teamsters Local 728. In Miami/Ft. Lauderdale, Location Managers are represented by Teamsters Local 769. In New Mexico Location Managers are members of IATSE 480. Across Canada Location Managers are represented by the Directors Guild Canada (DGC). Additionally, there is the Location Managers Guild International, a non-profit organization dedicated to the promotion and interests of their members and their relations with the general public, communities and industry partners.

Location Managers are commonly associated with production as being part of the management of a show and as such, are generally paid a weekly salary as opposed to an hourly wage. The average salary can vary depending on the experience of the individual and can range from a couple hundred dollars a day on low-budget films to almost a thousand dollars a day on commercials.

== Recognition ==
The California Film Commission has recognized the work of Location Managers with the California On Location Awards (COLA) since 1995, producing an annual awards show celebrating the best Location Professional, Team, and Public Servant in Film, Television, and Commercials.

The Location Managers Guild held their inaugural awards show in 2014 to honor the outstanding creative contributions of location professionals around the world, currently held in conjunction with the AFCI Location Show in Los Angeles.

== See also ==
- Location Managers Guild International, a guild representing location managers around the world
- Location library: a listing of locations available for film and TV shoots
