= Location shooting =

Filming in a real-world setting

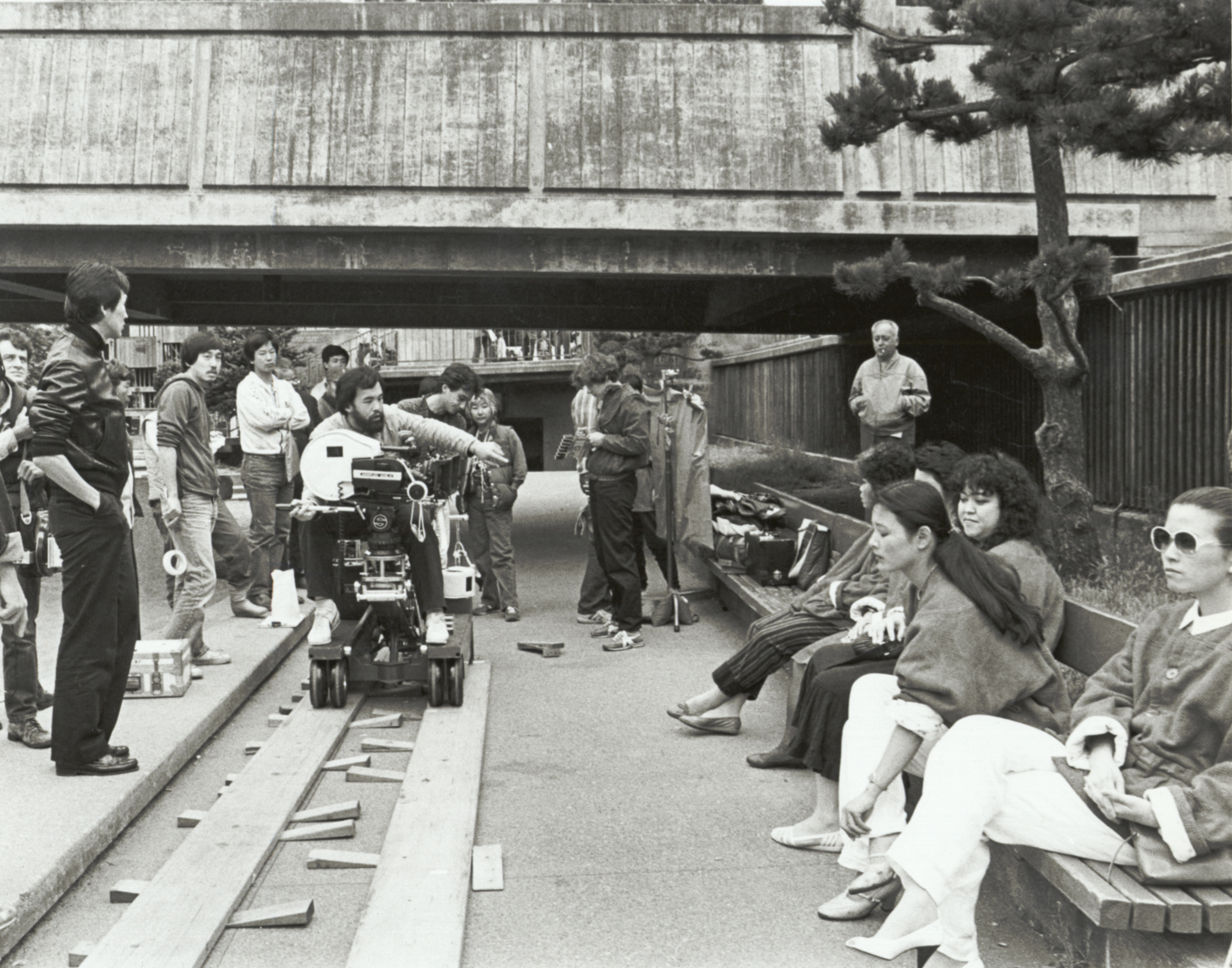
Mike Chin filming a low-budget movie on location in Portsmouth Square in San Francisco's Chinatown in 1983

Location shooting, also known as filming on location, is the shooting of a film or television production in a real-world setting rather than a sound stage or backlot. The location may be indoors or outdoors.

When filmmaking professionals refer to shooting "on location", they are usually referring to a "practical location", which is any location that already exists in the real world.

The filming location may be the same in which the story is set (for example, scenes in the film The Interpreter were set and shot inside the United Nations Headquarters in Manhattan), or it may stand in for a different locale (the films Amadeus and The Illusionist were primarily set in Vienna, but were filmed in Prague). Location shooting includes any practical location which resembles the location of a scene in the script; for example, students in the film school of the University of Southern California traditionally use a specific location in the basement of Doheny Library as a stand in for the corridors of Grand Central Terminal which lead to the rail platforms.

Most films feature a combination of location and studio shoots; often, interior scenes will be shot on a sound stage while exterior scenes will be shot on location. Second unit photography is not generally considered a location shoot.

Before filming, the locations are generally surveyed in pre-production, a process known as location scouting and recce.

== Pros and cons ==
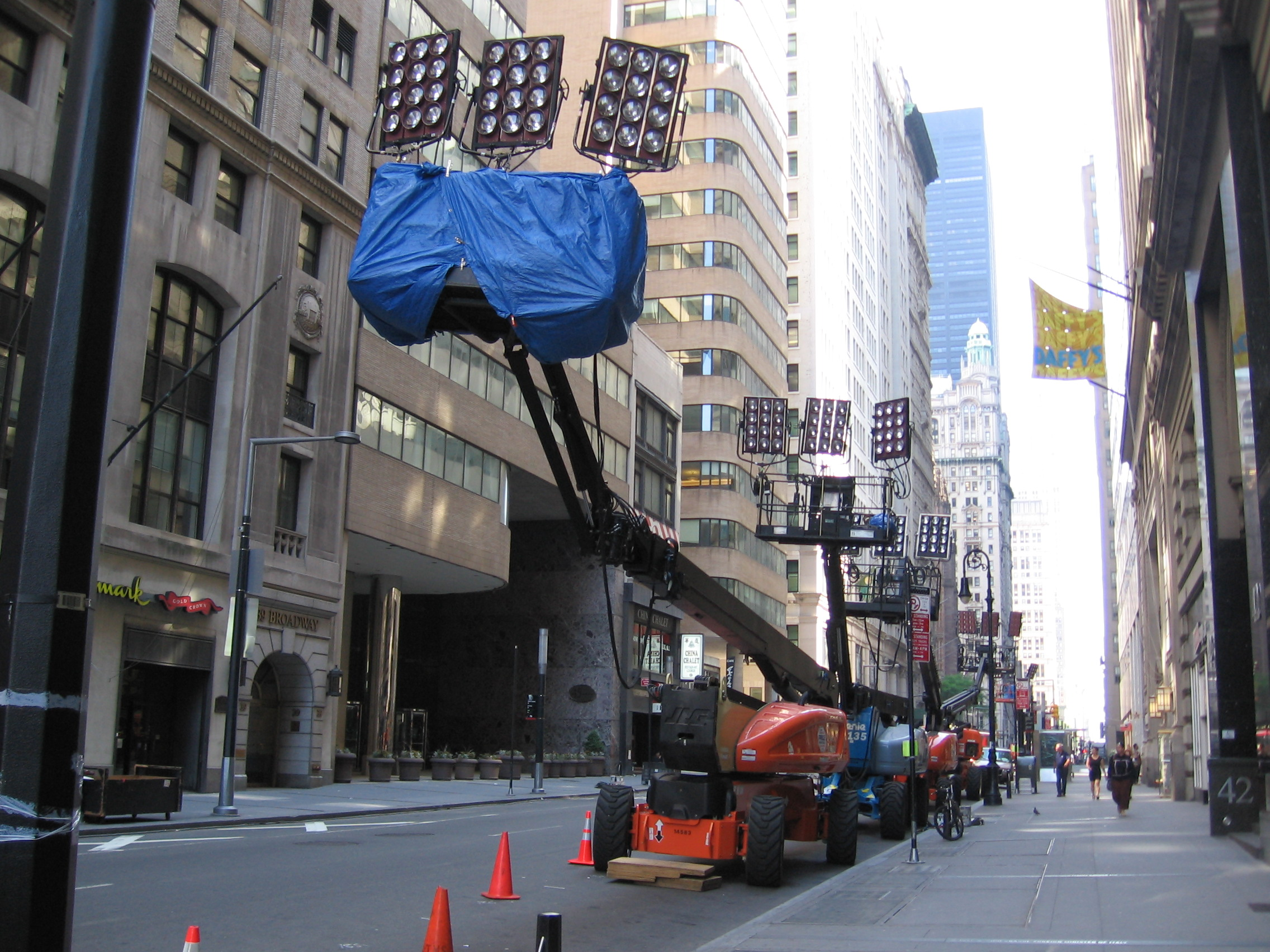
Between shoots for The Sorcerer's Apprentice at Bowling Green in New York City, lighting equipment was parked on Broadway.

Location shooting has several advantages over filming on a studio set. First and foremost is that real-world locations often offer rich "authenticity" which would be very expensive to duplicate elsewhere. Unless the actual location "has fallen into disrepair", it will always look better than a set.

If the events depicted in the screenplay occur at real locations on Earth and it is feasible to shoot the film at those locations as scripted—rather than an alternate location where one part merely resembles (or can be dressed to resemble) the desired location—then this opens up "unlimited camera angles". The cinematographer does not need to "crop or cheat" on camera angles "to avoid showing the artifice". On a set, it is hard to replicate real-world wear and tear, as well as architectural details, and the sheer size of rural areas, large cities, and large architectural landmarks is difficult to recreate on a backlot. The failure of Camelot (1967) caused American filmmakers to shift exterior shots from studio backlots to authentic locations. The film was widely criticized for its cheap look because it was obviously filmed on an architecturally ambiguous set against the chaparral-covered hills of Burbank.

Shooting outside of the home country is sometimes used to bypass union rules, labor regulations, or work stoppages. It can also allow "frozen" currency to be used: the 1968 movie Kelly's Heroes was filmed in Yugoslavia using profits that had been made on movie exhibitions in that country but could not be exported.

Conversely, there are a number of reasons why a production may choose not to shoot on location. While The Spy Who Loved Me (1977) filmed on location for many scenes, including one at Faslane that saved millions, production designer Ken Adam said that because of "television and new camera lenses and commercials, real life has been so much exploited", while using the giant new 007 Stage helped "provide a form of magic, of artificiality ... a form of escapism, I think". Filming on set also avoided additional fees from location shooting, Adams added, while director of photography Claude Renoir said that he preferred to film indoors because of better control of lighting. Shooting on a set gives the crew greater control over the environment: a room may be created to the exacting specifications of the story, for example, and there is no need to shut down street traffic when shooting on a backlot. For certain iconic locations like the Main Concourse of Grand Central Terminal, shooting cast members in a corner simply will not suffice. The crew will need to secure control over the entire space to control what enters the shot, and securing such a location can be a considerable challenge.

Additionally, a given location may have inconvenient restrictions. Compared to sets on a sound stage, most real-world building interiors usually have short ceilings, immovable walls, and nowhere to hang lights. As a result, lighting equipment is usually placed on the floor where it will get in the way and radiate heat energy into cast and crew at close range. Real-world locations like Grand Central Terminal may severely limit the days and times available for shooting because they need to remain available for other uses.

Location shooting by definition occurs outside the studio, but sometimes it can occur near the studio. This raises the problem of which locations are so close that they should be considered within reasonable commuting distance and the cast and crew must bear the cost of commuting there, and which locations are so unreasonably distant that the studio should bear the cost of putting up cast and crew in hotels. For Hollywood films, the boundary between the two is expressly delineated in union agreements and is known as the studio zone. Many location shoots, however, are far from the home studio, sometimes on the other side of the world. In these instances, location shooting can provide significant economic development benefits to the area in which they are shot. Cast and crew heavily rely upon local facilities such as catering, transportation, and accommodations. Local personnel are frequently hired to fill minor cast and crew roles, thereby relieving the studio of the expense of transporting all those people from its home country and obtaining appropriate work visas. A film that becomes a blockbuster hit can introduce movie audiences around the world to a visually breathtaking location that they were previously unaware of, as the Lord of the Rings trilogy did for New Zealand. This can boost tourism for years or even decades.

== Practicalities ==
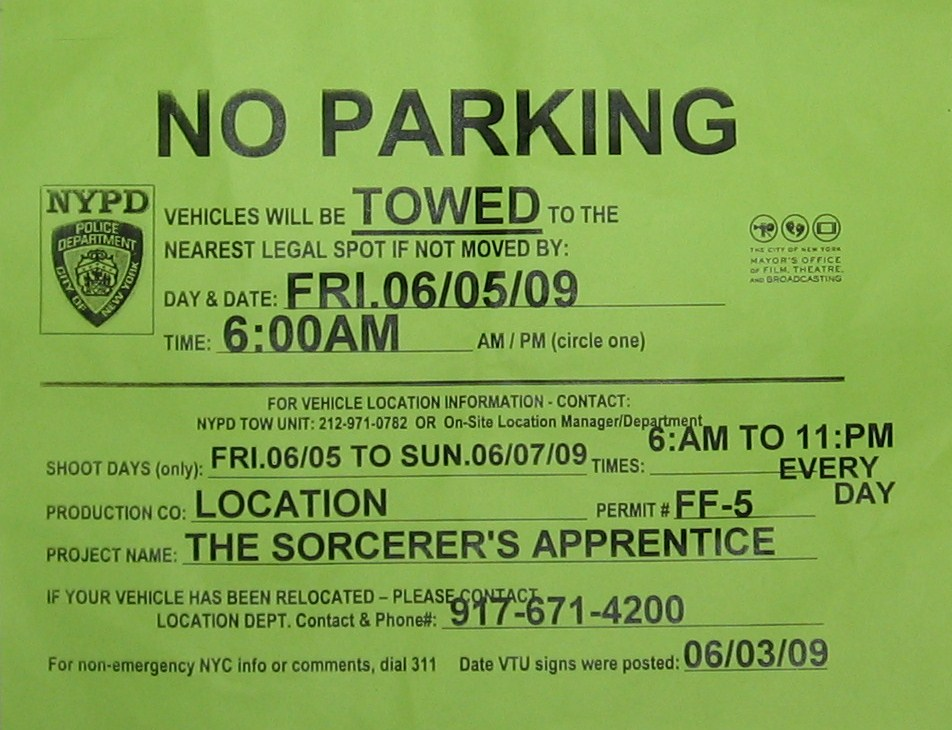
New York City's Mayor's Office of Film, Theatre and Broadcasting prohibits parking near shooting locations.

Location shooting usually requires a location manager, and locations are usually chosen by a location scout. Many popular locations, such as New York City in the United States, Toronto in Canada, and the Isle of Man, a crown dependency of the United Kingdom, have dedicated film offices to encourage location shooting, and to suggest appropriate locations to film-makers.

In many cases a second unit is dispatched to film on location, with a second unit director and sometimes with stand-in actors. These shots can then be edited into the final film or TV program alongside studio-shot sequences, to give an authentic flavor, without the expense or trouble of a full-scale location shoot. NYPD Blue, for example, was filmed primarily in Los Angeles, but used second unit footage of New York City for color, as well as featuring a small number of episodes filmed on location with the cast. Seinfeld, despite being centered around life in New York City, was almost entirely filmed in Los Angeles, with the second unit method being used in only a handful of episodes, with a stand-in for Cosmo Kramer.

== See also ==
- Location library
- Set (film and TV scenery)
- Filmmaking
- Lists of films by location
