= Location scouting =

Filmmaking and commercial photography production process

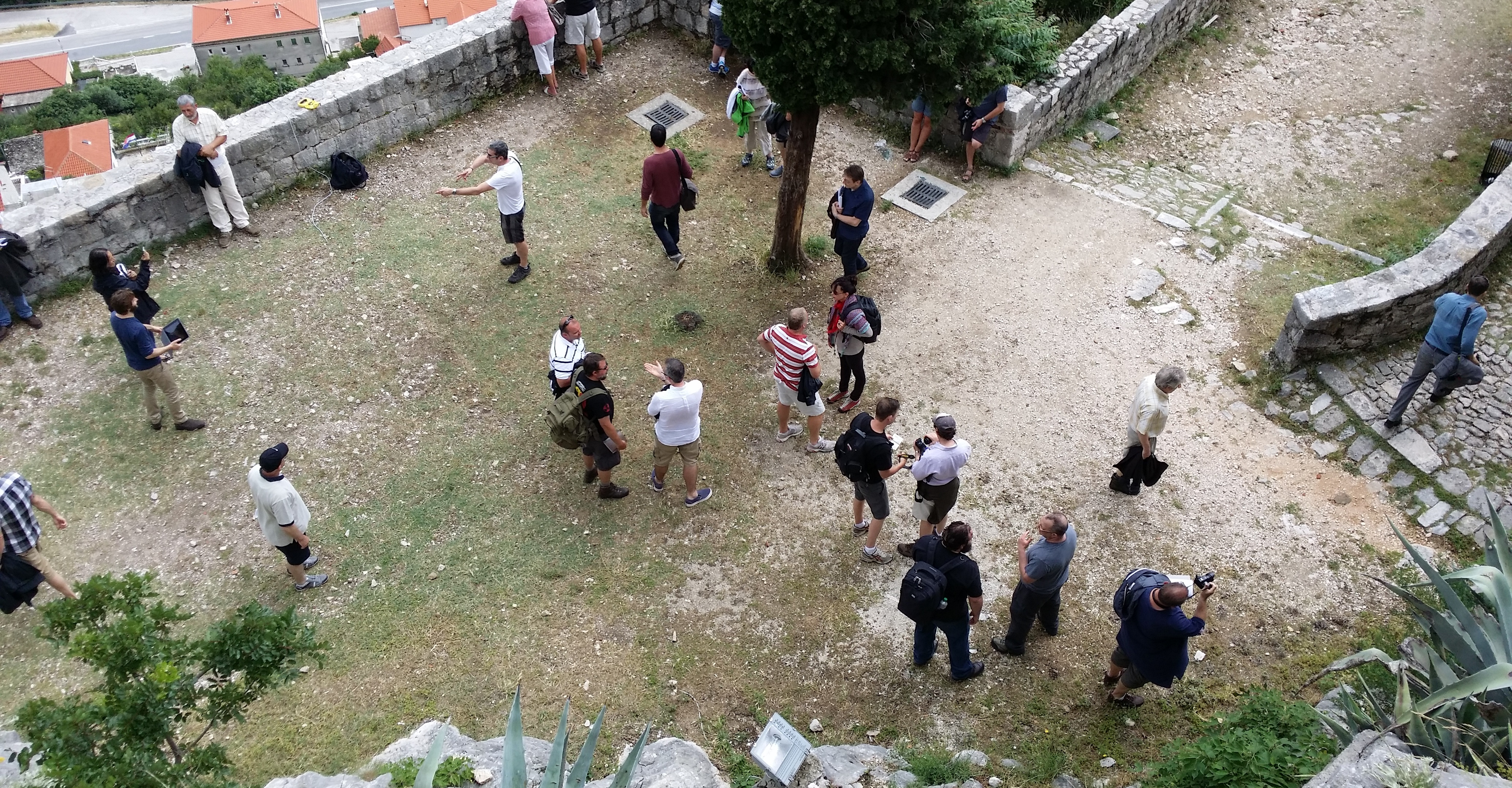
The production team of Game of Thrones location scouting at Klis Fortress, Croatia.

Location scouting is a vital process in the pre-production stage of filmmaking and commercial photography. Once scriptwriters, producers or directors have decided what general kind of scenery they require for the various parts of their work shot outside the studio, the search for a suitable place or "location" outside the studio begins. Location scouts also look for generally spectacular or interesting locations beforehand, to have a database of locations in case of requests.

Location scouts often negotiate legal access to filming locations.

== Location requirements ==
Suitability of a location to the task at hand takes into consideration many factors, including:

- overall aesthetic
- financial cost to production
- logistic feasibility including but not limited to distance from base of operations or other locations scheduled
- availability of parking and facilities to keep crew and talent (principal actors or models and extras) safe and dry at all times
- availability of electrical power or feasibility of bringing in generators for lights and electrical equipment.
- available light (indoors or outdoors) and weather conditions (outdoors)
- permission from and cooperation of location owner and neighbors, local government and law enforcement

== Work process ==
Typically, the production department and the locations department discuss ideas as to what a filming location should or could be. Then, research begins to find and document the location using location scouts.

The location scouts and other locations-department staff (see below), working under the supervision of the Location Manager, generally provide as many potentially useful and viable ideas and options as possible. These ideas and options are then reviewed by production, represented often by the assistant director, production manager, and director or executive producer, in the case of narrative filmmaking.

Once a consensus on locations with the most potential is reached, arrangements are normally made for some of the heads of the other production departments to tour those locations to confirm suitability. This tour is commonly called a "tech scout", "recce", or "go-see".

During this time, the locations department (most likely the location manager, in situations requiring the most responsibility) will have contacted and begun negotiations with internal and external parties who may affect the crew's ability to film at the location. This part of location scouting is known as "clearing the location" and involves investigating and confirming the availability of the location, the fees to be paid to a location owner or agent, obtaining a certificate of insurance, and obtaining any needed film permits, which may involve fees. "Resident letters" or "filming notifications" might also need to be distributed. These are notices to neighbors, advising them of the intent to film in the area, which is often a local requirement.

The completion of these steps results in "locking down" the location by ensuring that all details and existing or potential issues have been addressed. It is the locations department's job both to anticipate and minimize problems associated with a location and to advise other production-department heads of intractable problems for which contingencies can be planned or the decision to use an alternate location can be made, which might involve additional planning and budget allocation for additional location scouting.

== Change management ==
Production events involving the location department and its personnel can occur quickly and often. Likewise, the location requirements themselves (that is, script rewrites and creative concept changes) can change on the fly. More often than not, multiple locations associated with multiple scenes in production are involved. Under some circumstances, a freelancer or locations-department staffer could be involved in multiple projects simultaneously.

== Booking a site ==
After completing all the steps above, if a location is still viable and available, it is confirmed (booked). Usually a contract signed by all parties and a property release are obtained. The latter, a written, signed permission from the property owner or agent, allows photography and public depiction of the location via media (that is, broadcast, video, film, print publication).

Once a location is booked, filming typically begins as planned, since many hours of paid production work and considerable amounts of money for location fees and/or permits have been invested in the location. A change of creative concept at this stage or a glitch of any kind (such as property owner cancellation) is potentially costly, and legal action is a possible consequence. Also, if production misrepresents itself regarding its activities or its intended use of the location, damages the property, or negligently causes other problems for the property owner, the property owner may seek remedy in any of many forms, including legal action.

== Consideration of weather ==
Local weather conditions can figure heavily into a location's viability and affect many areas of production scheduling, so contingencies and alternate, budgetary-efficient plans should be made well in advance of any shoot day that could be affected by weather.

A location that could be affected by weather should always be cleared and placed in advance with the property owner's understanding and consent to the property being placed "on weather hold" or under the condition that production will only confirm its use of the location and commence photography pending viable weather conditions. The aim, in addition to attaining the correct aesthetic for the shot under acceptable and safe working conditions, is to provide greater flexibility in crew scheduling and the renting of equipment and vehicles while minimizing inconvenience to the owner, and in the event of cancellation or postponement by production due to weather, to eliminate or minimize any cancellation fees that may be part of an agreement between production and the location owner.

== Locations for various media ==
Location scouts may find and photograph locations for the productions of feature films and short films, television commercials and television shows, documentary films, corporate video, print advertising photography, editorial photography, and event planning.

The methods employed are much the same as for feature film production, but the processes often differ in some ways:

Turn-around times are generally shorter and decision making is shared between production, the director/photographer and the advertising agency or even the end client. A weekly broadcast television show may have significant deadline challenges.

Often the decision makers are geographically dispersed, which may explain why commercial and print scouts early adopted the use of online presentations and other digital technologies.

== Additional duties ==
The locations department's duties often extend beyond pre-production, into production and post-production. A location manager and/or other locations-department members are often needed during actual shooting and at wrap as a general point of internal contact for matters related to the locations department, such as ensuring smooth crew movement to and from the location, answering locations-related questions, solving miscellaneous problems as they arise, coordinating crowd control, and acting as an external point of contact between production and such parties as the property owner, neighbors, local film office/government, and law enforcement personnel.

Locations-department employees are always the last crew members to leave a location, and their credo is to leave the location in the same (if not better) condition than that in which it was found.

== Job titles and job descriptions ==
A film crew might be staffed with the following locations-department positions. Many of these positions often "cross over" or a member of the department might be responsible for executing duties related to several of these positions:

Location manager

The location manager oversees the locations department and its staff, typically reporting directly to the production manager and/or assistant director (or even director and/or executive producer). The location manager is responsible for obtaining the final permission to use a location for filming. Often, the location manager must also assist the production department and the finance department in maintaining their budget management regarding the actual location and permit fees as well as the production labor costs for both the location manager and the locations department at large.

Assistant location manager

The assistant location manager works with the location manager and the various departments in arranging technical scouts for the essential staff (grips, electric, camera, etc.) to see options which the location manager has selected for filming. The assistant location manager will be on the set during the filming process to oversee the operation, whereas the location manager continues preproduction from elsewhere (generally an office) on the upcoming locations. (Note: On most location-based television shows, two assistant location managers will alternate episodes, allowing one to prepare for an upcoming episode while the other is on the set with the current one.)

Location scout

The location scout does much of the actual research, footwork, and photography needed to document location possibilities. Often, the location manager will do some scouting personally, as will the assistant location manager.

Location researcher/coordinator

On a large film crew someone might be assigned exclusively to do research work for the locations department, freeing the location scouts to concentrate on photographing location possibilities or other tasks. This person's job might be to do Internet or public library research and contact resources to assess their interest in being involved in the film project, and if such interest exists, the location researcher might be responsible for setting up an appointment for a location scout to go there.

Location assistant

Hired by the location manager to be on-set before, during, and after the filming process. General responsibilities can include arriving first at the location to allow the set dressers into the set for preparation; maintaining the cleanliness of the location areas during filming (on larger budget projects this can include securing and supervising a contract clean-up crew or assigning such duties to a set production assistant); limiting the impact of a working production crew on the location grounds; fielding complaints from neighbors; and ultimately, at the end of the filming, managing on-set time and crew with regard to the closure of the location within contractually-permitted time constraints. There are generally one to three assistants on a shoot at any given time.

Location production assistant

This location production assistant position exists generally on larger budget productions. The locations production assistant is almost never on the set, but "preps" a location when it requires several days of set up or "wraps" the breakdown of a location prior to and following the days of filming.

Parking coordinator

The parking coordinator is typically hired by the location manager on an as-needed basis to supervise the parking staff in order to secure and coordinate crew parking, including that of equipment trucks and personal vehicles. The locations department and the parking department might work together with local law enforcement to coordinate traffic control if the scene being filmed involves roadway right-of-way.

Parking staff

The parking staff hang brightly colored "No Parking" signs and then sit in their cars (with an orange cone on the top) to ensure that no one parks in the coned off areas.

Waste removal

The location department is the last to depart a location upon wrap and is responsible for leaving the location in exactly, if not better, condition than it was upon arrival. A waste removal company might be hired on an as-needed basis.

== Methods ==
A location scout typically takes descriptive, panoramic photographs or video of location possibilities. The photography should reflect the possible location's fulfillment of the production's aesthetic goals. The location scout should also include visually descriptive utilitarian photography and information in their presentation, documenting much more than just what will potentially appear onscreen.

Additional descriptive information might include:

- Reverse/alternate angle (photographing toward where camera might be), panoramic photography, to show space available for camera, lighting, video assist, hair and makeup (and clients on a commercial shoot)
- Geographic coordinates, compass directions, and other map data as may be applicable
- Ambient lighting conditions at various times of day (or night), or solar data; that is, the angle of the sun at different times of day
- Photos of holding/staging areas and available parking and/or parking restriction signage
- Hand sketches of street/building layouts, building/room floor plans, room or area dimension data
- Crew/vehicle access data; that is, doorways, hallways, elevators, stairs, availability and information concerning the personnel needed for access
- Notes regarding ambient sound conditions
- On the shoot day, if a set is to be "dressed" (props/furniture added, moved, or removed), locations department and/or art department/Property master staff/prop stylist photograph the specific areas to be affected so as to assure that the location will be returned to its original state once filming is completed.

== See also ==
- Location library
- Location Managers Guild International
- Teamsters
- Television advertisement
