= Recce (filmmaking) =

Term in film production

Recce /ˈrɛki/ is a pre-filming visit to a location to determine its suitability for shooting. This is commonly carried out by the Director of Photography, and includes access to necessary facilities and assessment of any potential lighting or sound issues, and is closely related to location scouting.

The term is used in Europe, India, Australia, New Zealand, South Africa, Malaysia, Singapore, Indonesia and some areas in the United States. In the United States, the term "site survey" or "tech scout" is commonly used with the same meaning.

== Origins ==
"Recce" is borrowed from the military expression of the same name, which derived from "reconnaissance" in the noun sense and “reconnoitre” (from French reconnaître) in the verb sense.

== Radio and TV ==
The term "recce" is also used to refer to scouting recording or broadcast locations for radio and TV production.

== See also ==
- Location shooting
