= Bibliography of Harold Pinter =

Bibliography for Harold Pinter is a list of selected published primary works, productions, secondary sources, and other resources related to English playwright Harold Pinter (1930–2008), the 2005 Nobel Laureate in Literature, who was also a screenwriter, actor, director, poet, author, and political activist. It lists works by and works about him, and it serves as the Bibliography ("Works cited") for the main article on Harold Pinter and for several articles relating to him and his works.

== Bibliographical resources ==
- Baker, William, and John C. Ross, comps. Harold Pinter: A Bibliographical History. London: The British Library and New Castle, DE: Oak Knoll P, 2005. ISBN 978-1-58456-156-9. Print. "Oak Knoll Press Bestsellers", "Spring – Summer 2007 Catalogue" (PDF). Archived from the original (PDF) on 28 February 2008. (9.25 MB). Oak Knoll Press, 2007. (Page 37 of 40.)
- "Biobibliographical Notes" and "Bibliography" for "Harold Pinter, Nobel Prize in Literature 2005." In "Bio-bibliography". By The Swedish Academy. The Nobel Prize in Literature 2005. nobelprize.org. The Swedish Academy and The Nobel Foundation, Oct. 2005. 9. (English HTML version.) [Additional PDF versions accessible in English, French, German, and Swedish via hyperlinks.]
- Harold Pinter: An Inventory of His Collection at the Harry Ransom Humanities Research Center (1960–1980). Harry Ransom Humanities Research Center, University of Texas at Austin, 1999.
- "Links: Libraries and Academia" and "Publications": "Works By" and "Works About" Pinter. haroldpinter.org. Harold Pinter, 2000–[2009].
- Merritt, Susan Hollis, comp. "Harold Pinter Bibliography". SusanHollisMerritt.org. Susan Hollis Merritt, 2009. (Webpage pertaining to the "Harold Pinter Bibliography" published in The Pinter Review. Tampa: U of Tampa P, 1987– .)
- —. "Harold Pinter Bibliography: 2000–2002." The Pinter Review: Collected Essays 2003 and 2004. Ed. Francis Gillen and Steven H. Gale. Tampa: U of Tampa P, 2004. 242–300. Print.
- —. "Harold Pinter Bibliography: 2002–2004 With a Special Supplement on the 2005 Nobel Prize in Literature, October 2005 – May 2006." The Pinter Review: Nobel Prize/Europe Theatre Prize Volume: 2005–2008. Ed. Francis Gillen with Steven H. Gale. Tampa: U of Tampa P, 2008. 261–343. Print.
- The Pinter Review. Tampa: U of Tampa P, 1987– ). Ed. Francis Gillen and Steven H. Gale. HaroldPinter.org. Harold Pinter, 2000–[2008]. 3 January 2009. [Table of contents of past issues, retyped on index Webpage; occasional typographical variations.]
- The Pinter Review: Nobel Prize/Europe Theatre Prize Volume: 2005–2008. Ed. Francis Gillen with Steven H. Gale. Tampa: U of Tampa P, 2008. ISBN 978-1-879852-19-8 (hardcover). ISBN 978-1-879852-20-4 (softcover). ISSN 0895-9706. Print.

== The Harold Pinter Archive in the British Library ==
- British Library (BL). "Harold Pinter Archive: Additional Manuscripts 88880: Full Description". Manuscripts Catalogue. BL, London, 2 February 2009. (See below.)
- —. "Loan No. 110 A/1-74: Harold Pinter Archive". British Library Manuscripts (Loan) Catalogue. BL, London, 1994–2009. 3 January 2009. (Updated.) ["The manuscripts formerly held as Loan 110 A were purchased by the British Library with additional material in 2007 and are now part of the Harold Pinter Archive, which is numbered Add MS 88880." (See above.) The contents of this pre-acquisition online list of "Loan No. 110 A" has been incorporated in the BL's updated Manuscripts Catalogue after the BL acquired Pinter's Archive and catalogued it (a process completed in 2009). Although its earlier title listed "1-74" (boxes), it covered 80 boxes prior to the acquisition. The acquisition of over 150 boxes has been catalogued as part of its "Additional Collections": no. Add MS 88880; full descriptions provide references to the earlier box nos. incorporated in it.]
- —. "Pinter Archive Saved for the Nation: Archived 21 December 2007 at the Wayback Machine British Library Acquires Extensive Collection of UK's Greatest Living Playwright." The British Library: The World's Knowledge. British Library, 11 December 2007. [British Library press release.]
- Brown, Mark. "British Library's £1.1m Saves Pinter's Papers for Nation". Guardian.co.uk. Guardian Media Group, 12 December 2007.
- Gale, Steven H., and Christopher Hudgins. "The Harold Pinter Archives II: A Description of the Filmscript Materials in the Archive in the British Library." The Pinter Review: Annual Essays 1995 and 1996. Ed. Francis Gillen and Steven H. Gale. Tampa: U of Tampa P, 1997. 101–142. Print. [Follows up article by Merritt listed below; does not include an updated version of Merritt's "Appendix"; focuses on manuscript materials relating to Pinter's screenplays.]
- Howard, Jennifer. "British Library Acquires Pinter Papers". Chronicle of Higher Education, News Blog. The Chronicle of Higher Education, Inc., 12 December 2007.
- Merritt, Susan Hollis. "The Harold Pinter Archive in the British Library." The Pinter Review: Annual Essays 1994. Ed. Francis Gillen and Steven H. Gale. Tampa: U of Tampa P, 1994. 14–53. Print. [The first article describing in detail the contents of this archive; it includes: "Appendix: List of Boxes Presently in the Archive: Loan 110 A/1-(64): Harold Pinter Archive," which provides, with emendations and corrections, the original BL "finding list" through Box 64; in 1994 the "finding list" covered only through Box 61; this Appendix adds Boxes 62, 63, & 64, all pertaining to Pinter's screenplay adapting The Handmaid's Tale (a novel by Margaret Atwood) for the 1990 film The Handmaid's Tale. See British Library, "Loan No. 110 A/1-74: Harold Pinter Archive" and the follow-up article by Gale and Hudgins, both listed above.]
- O'Brien, Kate (BL Cataloguer). "When Do We Get to See the Stuff?!" Harold Pinter Archive Blog: British Library Curators on Cataloguing the Pinter Archive. British Library, 29 September 2008.

== Works ==
- "Apart From That". Areté 20 (Spring/Summer 2006): 5–8. Print.
- Art, Truth and Politics: The Nobel Lecture. Presented on video in Stockholm, Sweden. 7 December 2005. Nobel Foundation and Swedish Academy. Published as "The Nobel Lecture: Art, Truth & Politics". NobelPrize.org. Nobel Foundation, 8 December 2005. (RealPlayer streaming audio and video as well as text available). London: Faber and Faber, 2006. ISBN 978-0-571-23396-0. Rpt. also in The Essential Pinter. New York: Grove, 2006. (Listed below.) Rpt. also in PMLA: Publications of the Modern Language Association 121 (2006): 811–918. Print. Rpt. also in Various Voices: Sixty Years of Prose, Poetry, Politics 1948–2008 285–300. Print.
- "Art, Truth and Politics: The Nobel Lecture". Guardian. Guardian Media Group, 2 October 2007 and 8 December 2005 World Wide Web. 2 October 2007 and 7 May 2009. ["In his video-taped Nobel acceptance speech, Harold Pinter excoriated a 'brutal, scornful and ruthless' United States. This is the full text of his address"; features links relating to Harold Pinter's 2005 Nobel Prize in Literature. (Originally part of "Special Report: The Nobel Prize for Literature: 2005 Harold Pinter." Periodically updated and re-located since 2005.)]
- The Birthday Party, The Caretaker, The Homecoming, Landscape, Old Timesand Celebration. In The Essential Pinter. New York: Grove, 2006. ISBN 978-0-8021-4269-6. Print.
- "Campaigning Against Torture: Arthur Miller's Socks" (1985). ("Written as a tribute to Arthur Miller, on the occasion of his 80th birthday".) HaroldPinter.org. Harold Pinter, 3 July 2006. Rpt. in Various Voices 56–57.
- —. The Caretaker and The Dumb Waiter: Two Plays by Harold Pinter. 1960. New York: Grove, 1988. ISBN 978-0-8021-5087-5. Print.
- Celebration and The Room. London: Faber, 2000. ISBN 978-0-571-20497-7. Print.
- Death etc. New York: Grove, 2005. ISBN 978-0-8021-4225-2. Print.
- The Dwarfs. New York: Grove, 2006. ISBN 978-0-8021-3266-6. Print.
- The Essential Pinter: Selections from the Work of Harold Pinter. New York: Grove, 2006. ISBN 978-0-8021-4269-6. Print. [Inc. "Art, Truth & Politics: The 2005 Nobel Lecture"; 8 plays and the dramatic sketch "Press Conference"; and 10 poems.]
- The Hothouse: A Play by Harold Pinter. New York: Grove (Distributed by Random House), 1980. ISBN 978-0-394-51395-9, 978-0-394-17675-8, 978-0-8021-3643-5.
- Four Plays: The Birthday Party; No Man's Land; Mountain Language; Celebration. London: Faber, 2005. ISBN 978-0-571-23227-7. Print. [A "celebratory collection" of hardcover reprinted editions in a box set published in 2005 "to mark [Pinter's] Nobel Prize for Literature 2005".]
- Moonlight. New York: Grove, 1994.ISBN 978-0-8021-3393-9. Print.
- One for the Road. New York: Grove (Evergreen paperback), 1986. ISBN 978-0-394-62363-4, 978-0-394-54575-2. Print. ["With production photos by Ivan Kyncl and an interview on the play and its politics," by Nicholas Hern, entitled "A Play and Its Politics: A Conversation between Harold Pinter and Nicholas Hern" (February 1985).]
- Various Voices: Prose, Poetry, Politics 1948–2005. Rev. ed. 1998. London: Faber, 2005. ISBN 978-0-571-23009-9. Print.
- Various Voices: Sixty Years of Prose, Poetry, Politics 1948–2008. 3rd ed. 1998, 2005. London: Faber, 2009. ISBN 978-0-571-24480-5. Print.
- "Voices: Text by Harold Pinter and Music by James Clarke" Archived 11 February 2007 at the Wayback Machine. Through the Night. BBC Radio 3, Speech and Drama, 10 October 2005, 9:30–10:15 p.m. (LT). 10 October 2005 [live]. Repeated on 30 December 2006. (RealPlayer audio no longer accessible.) "BBC Press Office: Archived 7 January 2008 at the Wayback Machine Programme Information Network Radio Week 1". BBC Press Office. BBC, 10 October 2005. (Re-broadcast with Moonlight, as part of Harold Pinter Double Bill, on 15 February 2009, as listed below in #Multimedia resources.)
- War. London: Faber, 2003. ISBN 978-0-571-22131-8. Print. (Book revs. by Gardner and Brown.)

== Additional essays, letters, and speeches ==
- "The American administration is a bloodthirsty wild animal". Telegraph.co.uk. Telegraph Media Group, 11 December 2002. [A version of "Harold Pinter Gives Honorary Doctorate Speech at Turin University – 27 November 2002" (see below).]
- "Aristotle University of Thessaloniki Degree Speech April 18th 2000". HaroldPinter.org. Harold Pinter, 2000–[2008].
- "Blowing Up the Media: Index on Censorship, May 1992." Print. Rpt. in Various Voices 201–205. Print.
- "Caribbean Cold War". Red Pepper May 1996. Redpepper.org. Red Pepper magazine, May 1996. (Rpt. in Guardian 4 December 1996. Also rpt. in Pinter, Various Voices 209–212. Print.)
- "Degree Speech to the University of Florence 10th September 2001". HaroldPinter.org. Harold Pinter, 2002. Rpt. as "University of Florence Speech: On the Occasion of the Award of an Honorary Degree, 10 September 2001". Various Voices (Faber rev. ed., 2005) 238–240.
- "Eroding the Language of Freedom: Sanity, March 1989." Rpt. in HaroldPinter.org. Harold Pinter, 2000–[2008]. Rpt. in Various Voices (Faber rev. ed., 2005) 188–189. Print.
- Foreword. Degraded Capability: The Media and the Kosovo Crisis. Ed. Philip Hammond and Edward S. Herman. London: Pluto Press, 2000. ISBN 0-7453-1631-X. Print.
- "The Gulf War and the Continuing Bombing of Iraq" Archived 6 August 2007 at the Wayback Machine. HaroldPinter.org. Harold Pinter, 2000–[2008]. [Includes hyperlinked essays and speeches.] (See ""House of Commons Speech: 15 October 2002" below.)
- "Harold Pinter Gives Honorary Doctorate Speech at Turin University – 27th November 2002". Artists Network of Refuse & Resist!, 12 December 2005. Rpt. as "University of Turin Speech: On the Occasion of the Award of an Honorary Degree 27 November 2002." Various Voices 241–243. Also rpt. in War [7–9; n. pag.]. Print. (Another version was published as "The American administration is a bloodthirsty wild animal" [without internal quotation marks]; see above.)
- "House of Commons Speech – 15 October 2002" Archived 6 October 2007 at the Wayback Machine. HaroldPinter.org. Harold Pinter, 2002. Rpt. in Death etc. 71–73. Print.
- "House of Commons Speech – Tuesday 21st January 2003". HaroldPinter.org. Harold Pinter, 2003. Rpt. in Various Voices (Faber rev. ed., 2005) 244. Print.
- "Introduction by Harold Pinter, Nobel Laureate." 7–9 in 'Fortune's Fool': The Man Who Taught Harold Pinter: A Life of Joe Brearley. Ed. G. L. Watkins. Aylesbury, Buckinghamshire, Eng., UK: TwigBooks in association with The Clove Club, 2008. ISBN 978-0-9547236-8-2. Print.
- "Iraq Debate: Imperial War Museum, 23 September 2004". HaroldPinter.org. Harold Pinter, 2004. Rpt. in Various Voices 24–46. Print.
- "It Never Happened". Z Magazine. Z Communications, Feb. 1997. Rpt. in Various Voices (Faber rev. ed., 2005) 214–217. Print.
- "Letter from Pinter, Saramago, Chomsky and Berger". Scoop (New Zealand). Scoop.co.nz Independent News, 25 July 2006. ["This letter, signed by Harold Pinter, José Saramago, Noam Chomsky and John Berger, has been forwarded to major newspapers."]
- "Oh, Superman: Broadcast for Opinion, Channel 4, 31 May 1990." Rpt. in Various Voices 190–200. Print. Excerpt qtd. in "Politics" section of haroldpinter.org. Harold Pinter, 2007.
- "An Open Letter to the Prime Minister: Archived 6 August 2007 at the Wayback Machine Guardian 17 February 1998." Hyperlinked in "The Gulf War and the Continuing Bombing of Iraq". HaroldPinter.org. Harold Pinter, 2000–[2008]; (original posting) Oct. 2007. Rpt. in Various Voices (Faber rev. ed., 2005) 235–237. Print.
- "Speech at Hyde Park (F)ebruary 15th 2003". HaroldPinter.org. Harold Pinter, 2000–[2008].
- "The US and El Salvador: Observer, 28 March 1993." Rpt. in Various Voices 206–208. Print.
- "The US Elephant Must Be Stopped." Guardian, 5 December 1987". Rpt. in Various Voices (Faber rev. ed., 2005) 185–187. Print.
- "The War Against Reason". Red Pepper Dec. 2002. Rpt. in ZNet. Z Communications, 27 November 2002.
- "Why George Bush Is Insane" (2002). Rpt. in ZNet. Z Communications, 30 March 2007. [Another published version of the University of Turin Speech (27 November 2002), listed above, and rpt. in Various Voices (Faber rev. ed., 2005) 241–243. Print.]
- "Wilfred Owen Award for Poetry: Acceptance Speech, 18 March 2005". HaroldPinter.org. Harold Pinter, 2005. Rpt. in Death etc. 1–2 and Various Voices (Faber rev. ed., 2005) 247–248. Print.

== Poems ==
- "Death May Be Ageing" (Apr. 2005). Rpt. in Various Voices: Prose, Poetry, Politics 1948–2005 (2005 ed.) 180. Print. Also rpt. in "Poetry by Harold Pinter" in Another America (listed below).
- "Harold Pinter (b. 1930)". Poetryarchive.org. The Poetry Archive, n.d. [Biography, critical account, and streaming audio of a special recording of Pinter reading four of his poems: "Cancer Cells", "It is Here", "Later", and "Episode"; recorded 16 December 2002, The Audio Workshop, London; prod. Richard Carrington.]
- "Harold Pinter's Poetry". HaroldPinter.org. Harold Pinter, 2000–[2008]. [Includes "Harold Pinter's Most Recent Poetry" (periodically updated).]
- "Harold Pinter's War", by M. C. Gardner. Another America. Donald Freed, May 2007. [Includes texts and related review of War.] (See "Poetry by Harold Pinter", in Another America, listed below.)
- "Laughter." In "Review: Laughter: The Saturday Poem: By Harold Pinter." Guardian 25 November 2006, Guardian Review Pages: 23. Print.
- "Literature of the Gaieties". haroldpinter.org. Harold Pinter, 2000–[2008]. 1 November 2007.
- "Poetry by Harold Pinter". Another America. Donald Freed, May 2007. [Published with permission of Harold Pinter.]
- Sections of various printed collections such as Death etc., The Essential Pinter, The Pinter Review, Various Voices, and War. Print.
- "The Special Relationship" (Aug. 2004). haroldpinter.org. Harold Pinter, 2004. [Featured link accessible from home page.]
- "The 'special relationship'." Guardian 9 September 2004, G2: 4. Print.
- "The Watcher." Guardian 9 April 2007: 3. Print.

== Interviews ==
- Batty, Mark. "Pinter Views: Pinter on Pinter." 79–153 (chap. 8) in Batty, About Pinter. Print.
- Bensky, Lawrence M. "The Art of Theatre No. 3: Harold Pinter". Paris Rev. 10.39 (Fall 1966): 12–37. Print. Excerpt from archived contents of journal; hyperlinked ""The Art of Theatre No. 3: Harold Pinter"" (PDF). Archived from the original (PDF) on 1 January 2007. (280 KB). The Paris Review. Paris Review Foundation, Inc., 2004. [A frequently-cited source of Pinter's early views.]
- Billington, Michael. " 'I've written 29 damn plays. Isn't that enough?' " Guardian. Guardian Media Group, 17 March 2006. Transcript.
- —, comp. " 'They said you've a call from the Nobel committee. I said, why?': Harold Pinter in His Own Words". Guardian. Guardian Media Group, 14 October 2005.
- Bull, Andy. "Playwright Harold Pinter's Last Interview Reveals His Childhood Love of Cricket and Why It Is Better Than Sex". Guardian. Guardian Media Group, 27 December 2008.
- Burton, Harry. "Harold Pinter – Interview (MP3, 47mins, 19MB)" (Golden Generation conference podcast). British Library Online Gallery: What's On. British Library, 8 September 2008. Downloadable MP3 podcast. ["Harold Pinter shares his memories of postwar British theatre with actor and director Harry Burton." Introduced by Jamie Andrews (Head, Modern Literary Manuscripts, British Library) and recorded at the Golden Generation conference, held at the British Library on 8–9 September 2008.]
- Gussow, Mel. Conversations with Pinter. London: Nick Hern Books, 1994. ISBN 1-85459-201-7. Rpt. New York: Limelight, 2004. ISBN 0-87910-179-2. Print.
- Hern, Nicholas, and Harold Pinter. "A Play and Its Politics: A Conversation between Harold Pinter and Nicholas Hern." February 1985. 5–23 in Pinter, One for the Road. Print.
- Johnson, B. S. "Evacuees" (1968). The Pinter Review: Annual Essays 1994. Ed. Francis Gillen and Steven H. Gale. Tampa: U of Tampa P, 1994. 8–13. Print.
- Jones, Rebecca, and Harold Pinter. Interview. Today. BBC Radio 4 BBC, 12 May 2008. (Streaming audio [excerpts], BBC Radio Player; "extended interview" audio RealAudio Media [.ram] clip ["PINTER20080513"]. Duration of shorter, broadcast version: 3 mins., 56 secs.; duration of the extended interview: 10 mins., 19 secs.) [Interview with Pinter conducted by Jones on the occasion of the 50th anniversary revival of The Birthday Party at the Lyric Hammersmith, London; BBC Radio Player version was accessible for a week after first broadcast in "Listen again" on the Today website.]
- Koval, Ramona. "Harold Pinter". Books and Writing with Ramona Koval. ABC Radio National. Australian Broadcasting Corporation, 15 September 2002. Conducted at Edinburgh Book Festival, Edinburgh, Scotland, Aug. 2002. Radio. Transcript.
- —. "Harold Pinter, Nobel Prize-Winning Playwright and Poet, at Edinburgh International Book Festival (transcript available)." Edinburgh, Scotland, 25 August 2006. The Book Show. ABC Radio National. Australian Broadcasting Corporation, 25 September 2006. Radio. Transcript. (Downloadable MP3 audio file and printable transcript.) [Audio file includes Pinter's dramatic reading of a scene from his play The Birthday Party.]
- Lawson, Mark. "Pinter 'to give up writing plays' ". Inc. "Pinter on Front Row". Broadcast on BBC Radio 4. BBC News, 28 February 2005 (last updated). (RealPlayer audio.)
- Lyall, Sarah. "Still Pinteresque". The New York Times 7 October 2007, sec. 2 ("Arts & Leisure"): 1, 16; illus. Print. The New York Times, Movies. The New York Times Company, 7 October 2007. [Feature article which previews Sleuth; includes comments from Lyall's interview with Pinter and the hyperlinked film trailer.]
- Riddell, Mary. "The New Statesman Interview: Harold Pinter". New Statesman. New Statesman, 8 November 1999. [Includes audio clip.]
- Rose, Charlie. "An Appreciation of Harold Pinter". The Charlie Rose Show. WNET, New York, 2 January 2009. [Rebroadcast of "A Conversation with Harold Pinter" (filmed at the Old Vic Theatre and first broadcast on 1 March 2007). Introduced as "An appreciation of English dramatist, actor and theater director Harold Pinter who died on 24 December 2008" ("In memoriam"). (52 mins., 52 secs.; buffered).]
- —. "A Conversation with Harold Pinter." Charlie Rose. PBS. WNET, New York, 19 July 2001. Television. [First broadcast on 19 July 2001 from 11:00 p.m. EST to 12:00 a.m. EST; also broadcast on PBS affiliate channels at various scheduled times. (58 mins.).] Video clip (57 mins., 47 secs.). Google Video. Google, n.d.
- —. "A Conversation with Harold Pinter" (Filmed at the Old Vic, London). Charlie Rose. PBS. WNET, New York, 1 March 2007. Television. [First broadcast on 1 March 2007 from 11:00 p.m. ET to 12:00 a.m. ET; also broadcast on PBS affiliate channels at various scheduled times. PBS. WXXI-TV, Rochester, New York, 1 March 2007. Broadcast from 11:00 p.m. ET to 12:00 a.m. ET. (52 mins., 21 secs.) Full-length streaming video accessible directly from the show's Website. Rebroadcast as "An Appreciation of Harold Pinter" (See above).]
- Wark, Kirsty. "Harold Pinter on Newsnight Review". BBC News. BBC, 23 June 2006. ["Kirsty Wark introduces her interview with Harold Pinter, which aired on Newsnight Review, Friday 23 June, at 11pm on BBC TWO." (See below).]
- —. "Interviews: Nobel Prize Winning Playwright Harold Pinter Talks to Kirsty Wark". Newsnight Review. BBC Two, London, 23 June 2006. Television. BBC News. BBC, 25 June 2006. RealPlayer streaming video. (See above.)

== Stage productions ==
- "The Birthday Party: 8–24 May 2008". Lyric. Lyric Hammersmith, 2008.
- "The Birthday Party – Premiere". haroldpinter.org. Harold Pinter, 2000–[2008]. 3 October 2007. ["First presented by Michael Codron and David Hall at the Arts Theatre, Cambridge 28 April 1958, and subsequently at the Lyric Opera House, Hammersmith." Production details and excerpts from related reviews by Harold Hobson (See below) and others.]
- "The Caretaker – Premiere". Dir. Donald McWhinnie, Arts Theatre Club, Arts Theatre, London, 27 April 1960; transferred to the Duchess Theatre, London, 30 May 1960. haroldpinter.org. Harold Pinter, 2000–[2008]. 4 October 2007. [Production details and excerpts from related reviews.]
- The Dumb Waiter (1957). Dir. Harry Burton. Trafalgar Studios, London. Opened 2 February 2007. Trafalgar Studios. Ambassador Theatre Group, 2 October 2007.
- "Dumb Waiter Limited Run". 50th anniversary production. Press release. Sonia Friedman Productions, 3 January 2007.
- The Homecoming on Broadway: The Story. Dir. Daniel Sullivan. Cort Theatre, New York. 16 December 2007 – 13 April 2008. (Previews from 4 December 2007.) The Homecoming on Broadway. Jeffrey Richards Productions, 27 February 2008. (Official site of the 2007–2008 Cort Theatre production.) Archived version of home page. Internet Archive: The Wayback Machine, 12 October 2007.
- The Homecoming at the Internet Broadway Database. 7 January 2009.
- "The Hothouse". Dir. Ian Rickson. Lyttelton Theatre, Royal National Theatre, London. 11 July – 27 October 2007. National Theatre Online, n.d. [Features NT Video clip.]
- Krapp's Last Tape. Jerwood Theatre Upstairs, Royal Court Theatre, London. 12–24 Oct 2006. Royal Court Theatre, Oct. 2006.
- No Man's Land. Dir. Rupert Goold. Duke of York's Theatre, London. 27 September 2008 – 3 January 2009. Sonia Friedman Productions, n.d. (Transferred from the Gate Theatre, Dublin.)
- "One For The Road – Premiere" (1984). (A double bill with Victoria Station.) HaroldPinter.org. Harold Pinter, 2000–[2008]. 6 January 2009. [Production details and excerpts from related reviews.]
- "Sheffield Theatres: Harold Pinter: A Celebration". Sheffield Theatres, Sheffield, Eng., Oct. – Nov. 2006.
- "Victoria Station – Lyric Studio 1984". (A double bill with One for the Road.) HaroldPinter.org. Harold Pinter, 2000–[2008]. 6 January 2009. [Production details and excerpts from related reviews.]

== Official authorised biography ==
- Billington, Michael. Harold Pinter. London: Faber, 2007. ISBN 978-0-571-23476-9. Updated 2nd ed. of The Life and Work of Harold Pinter. 1996. London: Faber, 1997. Print.

== Other secondary sources ==
- Agencies. "'The foremost representative of British drama': Excerpts from the Swedish Academy's Citation Awarding the 2005 Nobel Prize for Literature to British Playwright Harold Pinter." Guardian, Culture: Books. Guardian Media Group, 13 October 2005. (Previously part of "Special Reports: The Nobel Prize for Literature" in 2005.)
- Allen-Mills, Tony. "This Pinter Guy Could Turn Into a Pain". Times Online. News International, 6 November 2005. ["Belatedly, Americans are wising up to a Nobel menace, says Tony Allen-Mills."]
- Anderson, Porter. "Harold Pinter: Theater's Angry Old Man: At the Prize of Europe, the Playwright Is All Politics." CNN.com. CNN, 17 March 2006.
- Baker, William. Harold Pinter. Writers' Lives Series. London and New York: Continuum International Publishing Group, 2008. ISBN 978-0-8264-9970-7 (hardback).) (paperback). ISBN 978-0-8264-9971-4 (paperback). Print.
- Batiukov, Michael. "Belarus 'Free Theatre' Is Under Attack by Militia in Minsk, Belarus". American Chronicle. Ultio, LLC, 22 August 2007.
- Batty, Mark. About Pinter: The Playwright and the Work. London: Faber, 2005. ISBN 978-0-571-22005-2. Print. [Includes chap. 9, "Views on Pinter: Friends and Collaborators" on 155–221.]
- Begley, Varun. Harold Pinter and the Twilight of Modernism. Toronto: U of Toronto P, 2005. ISBN 978-0-8020-3887-6. Print.
- Billington, Michael. "The Importance of Being Pinter: A New Production by the Belarus Free Theatre Reinforces the Global Resonance of the British Playwright's Political Works". Guardian, Arts blog – Theatre. Guardian Media Group, 16 April 2007.
- —. "Krapp's Last Tape: 4 Stars Royal Court, London". Guardian, Theatre. Guardian Media Group, 16 October 2006.
- —. "Passionate Pinter's Devastating Assault On US Foreign Policy: Shades of Beckett As Ailing Playwright Delivers Powerful Nobel Lecture." Guardian. Guardian Media Group, 8 December 2005, Books.
- —. "We Are Catching Up With This Man's Creative Talent At Last: The Current Rash of Pinter Revivals Is about Far More Than Guilt or Respect. Both Artistically and Politically, He Was Ahead of the Pack." Guardian, Comment. Guardian Media Group, 1 March 2007.
- Bond, Paul. "Harold Pinter's Artistic Achievement". World Socialist Web Site. World Socialist Web Site, 29 December 2005.
- Brantley, Ben. "Harold Pinter". The New York Times, Times Topics . The New York Times Company, 2009 (updated periodically). [Introd. to hyperlinked Harold Pinter News – The New York Times; includes menu of recommended external links.]
- —. "A Master of Menace." (Audio file.) (See "Multimedia resources" listed below.)
- —. "Theater Review: The Homecoming (Cort Theater): You Can Go Home Again, But You'll Pay the Consequences". The New York Times 17 December 2007, The Arts: E1. Print. The New York Times Company, 17 December 2007.
- Brown, Mark. "What Is It (War) Good for?" Socialist Review. Socialist Review, Sept. 2003. [Book rev. of War, by Harold Pinter.]
- "Bush and Blair Slated by Pinter". BBC News. BBC, 7 December 2005. (Features related links.)
- The Cambridge Companion to Harold Pinter. Ed. Peter Raby. Cambridge Companions to Literature. Cambridge: Cambridge UP, 2001. ISBN 978-0-521-65842-3. Print. Cambridge Collections Online. Cambridge University Press, n.d. [Hyperlinked table of contents.]
- Central School of Speech and Drama (CSSD). "Central Announces New President". Press release. Central School of Speech and Drama. University of London, 9 October 2008.
- —. "Central's 2008 Graduation Ceremony: Honorary Fellowships for Harold Pinter, Jo Brand and Penny Francis". Press release. Central School of Speech and Drama. University of London, 12 December 2008.
- Chomsky, Noam. "Comments on Dershowitz". ZNet. Z Communications, 6 September 2006. (Followed by text by Alan Dershowitz.)
- —. "Israel, Lebanon, and Palestine: Archived 1 October 2006 at the Wayback Machine Tariq Ali, John Berger, Noam Chomsky, Eduardo Galeano, Naomi Klein, Harold Pinter, Arundhati Roy, José Saramago & Howard Zinn" (Updated signatures). chomsky.info . Noam Chomsky, 19 July 2006. Web, 4 October 2007.
- Chrisafis, Angelique, and Imogen Tilden. "Pinter Blasts 'Nazi America' and 'deluded idiot' Blair". Guardian. Guardian Media Group, 11 June 2003.
- Christie, Janet. "Cautionary Tale about a Boy and Girl". Scotland on Sunday, Books. Scotsman Publications, 7 October 2007. "Cautionary Tale about a Boy and a Girl" (archived version). Internet Archive, 13 October 2007.
- Cohen, Lisa. "J. Barry Lewis on 'Betrayal'" Archived 10 July 2011 at the Wayback Machine, Edge (Ft. Lauderdale, Florida). Edge Publications, Inc., 1 March 2007.
- Cole, Olivia. "Cut the Pauses ...Says Pinter". Times Online. News International (News Corporation), 11 February 2007.
- Coppa, Francesca. "The Sacred Joke: Comedy and Politics in Pinter's Early Plays". 44–56 in The Cambridge Companion to Harold Pinter. Ed. Peter Raby. Cambridge: Cambridge UP, 2001. Print. Cambridge Collections Online. Cambridge University Press, n.d. [Extract; registered account required for access to full text.]
- Cuba Solidarity Campaign in the UK (CSC). Cuba Solidarity Campaign in the UK, 2009. Web, 24 June 2009. (Official Website updated periodically.) [Site originally entitled Hands Off Cuba! when Pinter first began supporting the CSC and when accessed on 3 October 2007 (see below). Re-titled The Cuba Solidarity Campaign in the UK. According to his official website, not yet fully updated, "Harold Pinter is an active delegate and speaker on behalf of the CSC, especially in its campaign against the US Embargo" ("Political organisations" and causes supported by Pinter as hyperlinked in "Politics" in HaroldPinter.org, 2000–[2009]. Web, 24 June 2009.]
- "Death of Vivien Merchant Is Ascribed to Alcoholism". The New York Times. The New York Times Company, 7 October 1982.
- "Degree Honour for Playwright Pinter" Archived 23 August 2019 at the Wayback Machine. AOL.co.uk. AOL (UK), 10 December 2008. [Cites Central School of Speech and Drama.]
- Diamond, Elin. Pinter's Comic Play. Lewisburg, PA: Bucknell UP, 1985. Print.
- Dougary, Ginny. "Lady Antonia Fraser's Life Less Ordinary: In a Frank Interview, the Famed Writer Talks about Motherhood, Catholicism, Her Parents and Soulmate Harold Pinter". Times Online. News International (News Corporation), 5 July 2008.
- Eden, Richard, and Tim Walker. "Mandrake: A Pinteresque Silence". Sunday Telegraph. Telegraph Media Group, 27 August 2006. <https://www.telegraph.co.uk/opinion/main.jhtml?xml=/opinion/2006/08/27/nosplit/dp2701.xml> (original URL). Bookrags.
- Ferguson, Niall. "Personal View: Do the Sums, Then Compare US and Communist Crimes from the Cold War". Telegraph. Telegraph Media Group, 11 December 2005.
- Filichia, Peter. "McCarter Gives Pinter a Happy 'Birthday Party' ". Star-Ledger. McCarter Theatre Ticket Office (Reviews), 18 September 2006.
- Fraser, Antonia, Must You Go? My Life with Harold Pinter, London, Weidenfeld, 2010. ISBN 978-0-297-85971-0
- Freed, Donald. "The Courage of Harold Pinter". Presentation at Artist and Citizen: 50 Years of Performing Pinter. University of Leeds, 13 April 2007. Another America. Donald Freed, Apr. 2007.
- French Embassy in the United Kingdom. "Harold Pinter Awarded Légion d'Honneur". France in the United Kingdom. French Embassy (UK), 17 January 2007. (Press release.)
- "French PM Honours Harold Pinter". BBC News. BBC, 18 January 2007.
- Gale, Steven H. Sharp Cut: Harold Pinter's Screenplays and the Artistic Process. Lexington: UP of Kentucky, 2003). ISBN 978-0-8131-2244-1. Print.
- —, ed. The Films of Harold Pinter. Albany: SUNY P, 2001. ISBN 978-0-7914-4932-5. Print.
- Gans, Andrew. "Broadway Homecoming Will Be a Week Later Than Originally Announced". Playbill, News. Playbill, 9 August 2007. [Features hyperlink to "Listings/Tickets/Broadway: The Homecoming", Playbill.]
- —. "Esparza to Return to Broadway in The Homecoming; McKean, Too", Playbill, News. Playbill, 24 July 2007.
- —. "Ian McShane to Have Broadway Homecoming". Playbill, News. Playbill, 14 November 2006.
- Ganz, Arthur R., ed. Pinter: A Collection of Critical Essays. Twentieth Century Views. Englewood Cliffs, NJ: Prentice Hall, 1972. ISBN 978-0-13-676387-1, 978-0-13-676379-6. Print. Archived version of full text. Internet Archive, n.d.
- Gardner, M.C. "Harold Pinter's War". Book rev. Another America Journal. Lightning Source, Inc., 2003. Another America. Donald Freed, May 2007.
- Gordon, Lois, ed. Pinter at 70: A Casebook. Casebooks on Modern Dramatists. 1990. Rev. and enl. ed. New York: Routledge, 2001. ISBN 978-0-415-93630-9. Print.
- Grimes, Charles. Harold Pinter's Politics: A Silence Beyond Echo. Madison & Teaneck: Fairleigh Dickinson UP; Cranbury, NJ: Associated UP, 2005. ISBN 0-8386-4050-8. Print.
- Gussow, Mel. "Critic's Notebook: On the London Stage, a Feast of Revenge, Menace and Guilt". The New York Times Company. The New York Times Company, 31 July 1991.
- Hadley, Kathryn. "Forward to Freedom". History Today News, History in the News. History Today Magazine, 15 June 2009.
- Hands Off Cuba! The Cuba Solidarity Campaign in the UK, n.d. [Official website updated periodically; cf. updated website for The Cuba Solidarity Campaign in the UK, listed above.]
- Hari, Johann. "Johann Hari: Pinter Does Not Deserve the Nobel Prize: The Only Response to His Nobel Rant (and Does Anyone Doubt It Will Be a Rant?) Will Be a Long, Long Pause" (column). Independent, Comment. Independent News & Media, 6 December 2005. Johann Hari, 2 October 2007. (Archived in johannhari.com.)
- "Harold Pinter Added to IFOA Lineup". Press release. International Festival of Authors (IFOA), Toronto, 1 October 2001."Harold Pinter Added to IFOA Lineup". Archived IFOA press release. The Internet Archive: The Wayback Machine. 4 October 2007.
- Harold Pinter at the Internet Broadway Database. 3 October 2007.
- "Harold Pinter Meets Free Theatre in Leeds". Press release. Belarus Free Theatre. Belarus Free Theatre, 2 May 2007. [English version has some typographical errors; also accessible in Belarusian [p??????] and in French [français]. Features photographs reposted from Mark Taylor-Batty's University of Leeds Website for the conference Artist and Citizen: 50 Years of Performing Pinter.]
- "Harold Pinter Taken to Hospital". BBC News. BBC, 30 November 2005.
- Hickling, Alfred. "Being Harold Pinter ***** Workshop, University of Leeds". Guardian. Guardian Media Group, 16 April 2007.
- Higgins, Charlotte. "Edinburgh Festival: Two-act rant from Sean and Harold". Guardian. Guardian Media Group, 26 August 2006.
- Hinchliffe, Arnold P. Harold Pinter. The Griffin Authors Ser. New York: St. Martin's P, 1967. Print.
- Hitchens, Christopher. "Opinion: The Sinister Mediocrity of Harold Pinter". Wall Street Jour. 17 October 2005, A18. Print. Wall Street Journal (Dow Jones & Company), 17 October 2005. [Electronic ed.; printable version "for personal, non-commercial use only."]
- Hobson, Harold. "The Screw Turns Again". Sunday Times 25 May 1958: 11. Print. (Cited in Merritt, Pinter in Play.) Rpt. in The Birthday Party. HaroldPinter.org. Harold Pinter, 2000–[2008]. 3 October 2007. (See also "Stage productions" listed above.)
- Hodgson, Martin. "British Jews Break Away from 'pro-Israeli' Board of Deputies". Independent. Independent News & Media, 5 February 2007. World Wide Web. 2 October 2007.
- Honigsbaum, Mark. "Publisher to Stand In for Pinter at Nobel Ceremony". Guardian. Guardian Media Group, 24 November 2005.
- Horwitz, Simi. "James Frain Joins 'The Homecoming'". Backstage.com. Nielsen Business Media, Inc., 2 October 2007.
- Howard, Jennifer. "Nobel Prize in Literature Goes to Harold Pinter, British Playwright Widely Studied in Academe". Chronicle of Higher Education. Chronicle of Higher Education, 13 October 2006.
- Hudgins, Christopher C. "Harold Pinter's Lolita: 'My Sin, My Soul'." 123–146 in Gale, The Films of Harold Pinter.
- —. "The Nobel Prize Festivities: Stockholm, December 2005. A Joyous Report." The Pinter Review: Nobel Prize/Europe Theatre Prize Volume: 2005–2008. Ed. Francis Gillen with Steven H. Gale. Tampa: U of Tampa P, 2008. 43–50. Print.
- —. "Three Unpublished Harold Pinter Filmscripts: The Handmaid's Tale, The Remains of the Day, Lolita." The Pinter Review: Nobel Prize/Europe Theatre Prize Volume: 2005–2008. Ed. Francis Gillen with Steven H. Gale. Tampa: U of Tampa P, 2008. 132–139. Print.
- Jacobson, Aileen. "Pinter's Pauses: Even the Playwright Thinks They've Led to Over-pausing. But Actors in Two New Productions Find Them Exciting." Newsday, 5 November 1989. Print.
- Jones, Edward T. "On The Remains of the Day: Harold Pinter Remaindered." 99–107 in Gale, The Films of Harold Pinter.
- Jones, David. "Travels with Harold". Front & Center Online ("The Online Version of Roundabout Theatre Company's Subscriber Magazine"). Roundabout Theatre Company, Fall 2003.(3 pages.) ["David Jones' Staging of The Caretaker for Roundabout Culminates a 40-Year Career Acting and Directing the Work of Harold Pinter. Here the Director Looks Back."]
- Karwowski, Michael. "Harold Pinter – a Political Playwright?" Contemporary Review 283.1654 (Nov. 2003): 291–296. Rpt. in Encyclopedia.com.
- Lahr, John. "Demolition Man: Harold Pinter and 'The Homecoming' " Archived 11 March 2014 at the Wayback Machine. New Yorker 24 December 2007, "Onward and Upward with the Arts". Print. New Yorker. New Yorker Magazine, 16 December 2007. 16 December 2007. (Advance online version: 6 pages online; 7 pages in printout.)
- "Letter of Motivation for the European Theatre Prize". 10th Edition of the Europe Theatre Prize to Harold Pinter ("X Premio Europa per il teatro a Harold Pinter"). premio-europa.org. Europe Theatre Prize, Turin, Italy, 8–12 March 2006. 10 March 2009.
- Lyall, Sarah. "Playwright Takes a Prize and a Jab at U.S." The New York Times. The New York Times Company, 8 December 2006. 2 October 2007. [Correction appended 10 December 2005: "An article on Thursday about the playwright Harold Pinter's criticism of American foreign policy in his acceptance speech for the Nobel Prize for literature described it incompletely. He said that both President Bush and Prime Minister Tony Blair – and not just Prime Minister Blair – should be tried before the International Criminal Court of Justice for the invasion of Iraq."]
- Mbeki, Thabo. "Letter from the President: Hail the Nobel Laureates – Apostles of Human Curiosity!". ANC Today ("Online Voice of the African National Congress") 5.42 (21–27 October 2005). African National Congress, 12 November 2007.
- [McDowell, Leslie.] "Book Festival Reviews: Pinter at 75: The Anger Still Burns: Harold Pinter". The Scotsman 26 August 2006: 5. Print. The Scotsman Publications Limited (Johnston Press Plc), (updated) 27 August 2006.
- Merritt, Susan Hollis. "(Anti-)Global Pinter." The Pinter Review: Nobel Prize/Europe Theatre Prize Volume: 2005–2008. Ed. Francis Gillen with Steven H. Gale. Tampa: U of Tampa P, 2008. 140–167. Print.
- —. "Betrayal in Denver." The Pinter Review: Collected Essays 2003 and 2004. Ed. Francis Gillen and Steven H. Gale. Tampa: U of Tampa P, 2004. 187–201. Print.
- —. "Europe Theatre Prize Celebration – Turin, Italy." Harold Pinter Society Newsletter, Fall 2006. (Downloadable electronic document sent to members.)
- —. "Harold Pinter's Ashes to Ashes: Political/Personal Echoes of the Holocaust." The Pinter Review: Collected Essays 1999 and 2000. Ed. Francis Gillen and Steven H. Gale. Tampa: U of Tampa P, 2000. 73–84. Print.
- —. Pinter in Play: Critical Strategies and the Plays of Harold Pinter. 1990. Durham and London: Duke UP, 1995. ISBN 978-0-8223-1674-9.
- —. "Pinter Playing Pinter: The Hothouse." The Pinter Review: Collected Essays 1995–1996. Ed. Francis Gillen and Steven H. Gale. Tampa: U of Tampa P, 1997. 73–84. Print.
- —. "Talking about Pinter." (On the Lincoln Center Festival 2001: Harold Pinter Festival Symposia.) The Pinter Review: Collected Essays 2001 and 2002. Ed. Francis Gillen and Steven H. Gale. Tampa: U of Tampa P, 2002. 144–167. Print.
- Moss, Stephen. "The Guardian Profile: Harold Pinter: Under the Volcano". Guardian. Guardian Media Group, 4 September 1999. 2 October 2007.
- "The Nobel Prize for Literature 2005: Harold Pinter". Guardian. Guardian Media Group, [2005–2009]. 23 March 2009. (Index of articles; some part of "Special Reports: The Nobel Prize for Literature" in 2005.)
- "Palestinian Nation Under Threat". Independent. Independent News & Media, 21 July 2006. 3 October 2007.
- Parini, Jay. "Theater: Pinter's Plays, Pinter's Politics". Chronicle of Higher Education, Chronicle Rev. Chronicle of Higher Education, 11 November 2005. (3 pages.)
- "People". Time . Time Inc., 11 August 1975. 2 October 2007. [Archived in the Time Archive: 1923 to the Present.] (Page 1 of 2 pages.)
- Pilger, John. "The Silence of Writers". ZNet. Z Communications, 16 October 2005. 5 July 2006.
- "Pinter Honoured for a Lifetime's Contribution to the Arts". University of Leeds press release. University of Leeds, 13 April 2007. 15 April 2007.
- "Pinter Wins Nobel Literary Prize". BBC News . BBC, 13 October 2005. 2 October 2007.
- "Protesters Will Defy Ban on Anti-Bush Demo on Sunday 15 June". Socialist Worker Online (UK). Socialist Worker, 14 June 2008. 12 June 2008.
- Pryce-Jones, David. "Harold Pinter's Special Triteness: Harold Pinter Wins the Nobel Prize in Literature." National Review 7 November 2005. National Review Online (National Review, Inc.), 28 October 2005. Rpt. in "News Publications: 2005 Ad". BNET: Business Network. FindArticles (Gale Cengage Learning), 2008. CBS Interactive, Inc., 2009. 7 March 2009. (3 pages.)
- Quigley, Austin E. "Pinter, Politics and Postmodernmism (I)." 7–27 in The Cambridge Companion to Harold Pinter. Print.
- Reddy, E. S. "Free Mandela: An Account of the Campaign to Free Nelson Mandela and All Other Political Prisoners in South Africa." African National Congress (ANC): Documents: History of Campaigns. African National Congress, July 1988. 5 January 2009.
- Riddell, Mary. "Comment: Prophet without Honour: Harold Pinter Can Be Cantankerous and Puerile. But He Is a Worthy Nobel Prizewinner." Guardian.co.uk. Guardian Media Group, 11 December 2005. 6 January 2009.
- Robertson, Campbell. "In Search of Her Inner Kangaroo Suit: Eve Best Storms Broadway and New York." The New York Times, 24 December 2007, The Arts: E1, 6. 24 December 2007. Print. The New York Times Company, 24 December 2007. 24 December 2007. (Interview with actress Eve Best [Ruth in The Homecoming (Cort Theatre)].)
- Robinson, David. "Books: Doyle Returns to an Old Favourite in New Work; ... Harold Pinter". Scotsman, Living. Scotsman, 28 August 2006. 2 October 2007.
- —. "I'm Written Out, Says Controversial Pinter". Scotsman 26 August 2006: 6. Print. Scotsman, 26 August 2006.
- Sheffield Theatres. "Latest News: August 2006: Sheffield Theatres Presents Pinter: A Celebration". Press release. Sheffield Theatres, 18 August 2006. 7 January 2009.
- Shenton, Mark. "Pinter in Turin". Stage Blogs: Shenton's View. Stage Newspaper Limited, 11 March 2006. 15 March 2009.
- Smith, Alastair. "Pinter Replaces Mandelson as Central President". Stage. Stage Newspaper Limited, 14 October 2008. 15 October 2008.
- Smith, Martin J. "My Diary of Pinter's Homecoming". Guardian, Arts Blog – Theatre. Guardian Media Group, 16 March 2007. 16 March 2007.
- Smith, Neil. " 'Political element' to Pinter Prize?" BBC News. BBC, 13 October 2005.
- Smith, Susan Harris. " 'Pinteresque' in the Popular Press." The Pinter Review: Collected Essays 2003 and 2004. Ed. Francis Gillen and Steven H. Gale. Tampa: U of Tampa P, 2004. 103–108. Print.
- Sofer, Andrew. "The Cheese-Roll under the Cocktail Cabinet: Pinter's Object Lessons." The Pinter Review: Collected Essays 2003 and 2004. Ed. Francis Gillen and Steven H. Gale. Tampa: U of Tampa P, 2004. 29–38. Print.
- "Special Report: The Nobel Prize for Literature: 2005 Harold Pinter" Archived 14 October 2008 at the Wayback Machine. Guardian. Guardian Media Group, 2 October 2007. World Wide Web. 2 October 2007. (Features links relating to Harold Pinter's 2005 Nobel Prize in Literature. [Periodically updated and re-located.])
- Swedish Academy. "The Nobel Prize in Literature 2005: Harold Pinter". Nobelprize.org. Swedish Academy and Nobel Foundation, 13 October 2005. (Hyperlinked account. Provides links to the official Nobel Prize announcement, Bio-bibliography, Bibliography, press release, press conference, and audio and video streaming media files of the press conference and related interviews and features. These resources are accessible on the official websites of both the Nobel Prize (Nobel Foundation) and the Swedish Academy; they are periodically revised and re-located.)
- Taylor-Batty, Mark. "Fling Open Door and Let Pinter's Pause Be Heard." Times Higher Education Supplement 27 April 2007: 12. Print.
- Thomson, David T. Pinter: The Player's Playwright. London: Macmillan, 1985. New York: Schocken, 1985. ISBN 0-8052-3964-2. Print.
- Toíbín, Colm. "Pinter Takes On Beckett". Daily Telegraph. News International, 7 October 2006. ("As Harold Pinter prepares to tackle 'Krapp's Last Tape', novelist Colm Toíbín looks forward to a meeting of two theatrical giants.")
- Traub, James. "The Way We Live Now: Their Highbrow Hatred of Us". The New York Times. The New York Times Company, 30 October 2005. (Site registration may be required.)
- "Travel Advisory: Toronto Festival Honors 14 Leaders in the Arts". The New York Times (Archive). The New York Times Company, 9 September 2001.
- Wardle, Irving. "The Birthday Party." Encore 5 (July–Aug. 1958): 39–40. Rpt. in The Encore Reader: A Chronicle of the New Drama. Ed. Charles Marowitz, Tom Milne, and Owen Hale. London: Methuen, 1965. 76–78. Print. (Reissued as: New Theatre Voices of the Fifties and Sixties. London: Eyre Methuen, 1981.)
- —. "Comedy of Menace." Encore 5 (Sept.–Oct. 1958): 28–33. Rpt. in The Encore Reader and New Theatre Voices 86–91. Print.
- —. "Pinter, Harold." 657–658 in The Reader's Encyclopedia of World Drama. Ed. John Gassner and Edward Quinn. New York: Crowell, 1969. Print.
- "There's Music in That Room." Encore 7 (July–Aug. 1960): 32–34. Rpt. in The Encore Reader and New Theatre Voices 129–132. Print.
- Wästberg, Per. "The Nobel Prize in Literature 2005: Presentation Speech". Nobelprize.org. The Nobel Foundation and The Swedish Academy, 10 December 2005. Web, 2 October 2007. (Full text; links to video clips of the Nobel Ceremony provided online.)
- West, Samuel. "Fathers and Sons". Guardian. Guardian Media Group, 17 March 2007. ["How does it feel to act in a Pinter play for radio alongside the man himself? Samuel West reveals all."]
- Wilfred Owen Association Newsletter 4 August 2004. Print.
- Woolf, Henry. "My 60 Years in Harold's Gang". Guardian.co.uk. Guardian Media Group, 12 July 2007.

== Multimedia resources ==
- Brantley, Ben. "A Master of Menace" (audio file). Hyperlinked in "Multimedia". In "Harold Pinter". The New York Times, Times Topics. The New York Times Company, 13 October 2005.
- BWW News Desk. "Photo Flash: No Man's Land at the Duke of York....Photos by Jeremy Whelehan". BroadwayWorld.com. Broadway World, 10 November 2008.
- Celebration (2000). More 4. Channel Four, London. Television. Channel 4, 26 February 2007. (Includes video clips of filmed stage prod.; first broadcast Feb. 2007.)
- Harold Pinter: Art, Truth & Politics: The Nobel Prize Lecture. © Copyright 2006 Illuminations. All Rights Reserved. Transmission Channel 4, 2005. DVD. 46 mins. (DVD and VHS video recordings. Catalogue listing.) 2 October 2007. [Features preview video clip.]
- "Harold Pinter Slideshow". "Harold Pinter". The New York Times, Times Topics. The New York Times Company, 13 October 2005.
- "The Hothouse". By Harold Pinter. Dir. Ian Rickson. Lyttelton Theatre, Royal National Theatre, London, 11 July – 27 October 2007. National Theatre Online (Royal National Theatre), 6 January 2009. [Features NT Video clip of stage prod.]
- Mondello, Bob, and Robert Siegel. "Remembrances: An Appreciation of Harold Pinter". All Things Considered. National Public Radio. 25 December 2008. 25 December 2008. [Hyperlinked audio clip; 3 mins., 42 secs.]
- "Playwright Harold Pinter Dies". BBC News. BBC, 25 December 2008. [Features photographs and video.] (See selection of Obituaries below.)
- Moonlight and Voices. Harold Pinter Double Bill. BBC Radio 3 Drama Programmes – Drama on 3. BBC, 15 February 2009. [First broadcast 10 October 2005, as part of Pinter's 75th birthday celebration. (See Voices, as listed above in #Works). Re-broadcast 15 February 2009, as part of Harold Pinter Tribute. (Streaming audio accessible for 7 days after broadcasts).]
- "Press Releases & Press Packs" for Pinter at the BBC. BBC Press Office, 3 October 2002.
- Rose, Charlie. "An Appreciation of Harold Pinter". The Charlie Rose Show. WNET, New York, 2 January 2009. [Rebroadcast of the interview with Pinter conducted on 1 March 2007, introduced as "An appreciation of English dramatist, actor and theater director Harold Pinter who died on 24 December 2008" ("In memoriam"). (52 mins., 52 secs.; buffered.)]
- Sleuth. Sony Pictures Classics. Sony Pictures, n.d. 2 October 2007. [Features video clip of film trailer.]
- Sleuth at IMDb. IMDb.com, (updated) 2009. [Features updated news and video clips, including film trailer.]
- Tamara's Return (1998) at IMDb. Episode 4 of Season 2 (204). Dawson's Creek: The Complete Second Season. DVD. Sony Pictures, (released) 16 December 2003.
- Tennant, Neil, and Chris Lowe (The Pet Shop Boys). "Up Against It". Song lyrics. petshopboys.co.uk: The Official Site. 2 October 2007. ["Browse all lyrics alphabetically" accessible via "Lyric of the day: Read more". Requires Adobe Flash Player 8 or above.]
- Working With Pinter. Dir. Harry Burton. First televised on More 4, Channel 4, 26 February 2007. Repeated 9 March 2007. (Program listing. Features Windows Media Player video clip.) [Screened at Artist and Citizen: 50 Years of Performing Pinter, University of Leeds, 12 April 2007; at the East End Film Festival, at Genesis Mile End Cinema, London, 23 April 2007; and at the End of the Pier International Film Festival, Bognor Regis, West Sussex, 1 May 2007.]

== Obituaries and related articles ==
- Abbott, Diane. "Diane Abbott Calls for Pinter Cinema". DianeAbbott.org.uk. Diane Abbott Labour MP for Hackney North and Stoke Newington (site funded from the Parliamentary Members Communications Allowance), 16 January 2009.
- Adams, Stephen. "Harold Pinter Directs His Own Funeral". Telegraph. Telegraph Media Group, 31 December 2008. ["His plays were masterpieces of artistic control. And even at his own funeral Harold Pinter made sure he exerted a director's influence."]
- Alderman, Geoffrey. "Editorial: Harold Pinter – A Jewish View". Current Viewpoint. Current viewpoint.com, 27 March 2009.
- Andrews, Jamie. " 'Tender the dead, as you yourself would be tendered...' ". Harold Pinter Archive Blog: British Library Curators on Cataloguing the Pinter Archive. British Library, 6 January 2009.
- Baker, Terry. "Harold Pinter and the Sports Field." The Clove's Lines: The Newsletter of The Clove Club: The Old Boys of Hackney Downs School 3.2 (Mar. 2009): 10. Print.
- Billington, Michael. "Goodnight, Sweet Prince: Shakespearean Farewell to Pinter". Guardian. Guardian Media Group, 1 January 2009.
- —. "Harold Pinter". Guardian. Guardian Media Group, 25 December 2008.
- British Library. "Harold Pinter (1930–2008)". Harold Pinter Archive Blog: British Library Curators on Cataloguing the Pinter Archive. British Library, 29 December 2008.
- Brooks, Melvyn. "A Memory of Harold Pinter." The Clove's Lines: The Newsletter of The Clove Club: The Old Boys of Hackney Downs School 3.2 (Mar. 2009): 14. Print.
- Cavendish, Dominic. "Harold Pinter: How the Theatre World Saw Him". Telegraph, Blogs. Telegraph Media Group, 26 December 2008. (Reprints an article that Cavendish "compiled for the Telegraph shortly after Pinter turned 70 – back in October 2000 – on the eve of the 40th anniversary reval of 'The Caretaker', the play which catapulted him to fame and fortune."]
- Cohen, Nick. "Pinter Was Powerful and Passionate, But Often Misguided". Observer, "Comment is Free". Guardian Media Group, 28 December 2008.
- Coveney, Michael. "Harold Pinter: A Celebration, National Theatre, London: Some Pauses to Remember" Archived 18 May 2011 at the Wayback Machine. Independent. Independent News and Media, 9 June 2009.
- Dodds, Paisley (Associated Press). "Nobel-winning Playwright Harold Pinter Dies at 78". ABC News. American Broadcasting Company, 25 December 2008.
- Dorfman, Ariel. "The World That Harold Pinter Unlocked". Washington Post. Washington Post, 27 December 2008, A15. Print. The Washington Post Company, 27 December 2008.
- —. " 'You want to free the world from oppression?' ". New Statesman, Jan. 2009. New Statesman, 8 January 2009. World Wide Web. 9 January 2009. ["Ariel Dorfman on the life and work of Harold Pinter (1930–2008)."]
- Driscoll, Margarette. "Yo, Grandpa Pinter, Big Respect". Times Online. News International (News Corporation), 11 January 2009. [Concerns the poem "Grandpa", © Simon Soros 2008, listed below.]
- Eden, Richard. "Harold Pinter Faces Opposition to Memorial in Poet's Corner". Telegraph. Telegraph Media Group, 3 January 2009.
- Edgar, David. "Pinter's Weasels". Guardian, "Comment is Free". Guardian Media Group, 29 December 2008. ["The idea that he was a dissenting figure only in later life ignores the politics of his early work."]
- "Editorial: Harold Pinter: Breaking the Rules". Guardian. Guardian Media Group, 27 December 2008. ["Pinter broke the rules in art and in life."]
- Edwardes, Jane. "Time Out's Tribute to Harold Pinter" Archived 12 October 2012 at the Wayback Machine. Time Out London, Theatre. Time Out Group Ltd., 31 December 2008.
- Fenton, Anna, and Lucy Jackson. "Harold Pinter: A Look Back". Journal. The Edinburgh Journal Limited, 11 & 12 January 2009.
- "Friends Bid Pinter Farewell". BBC News. BBC, 1 January 2009.
- Gussow, Mel, and Ben Brantley."Harold Pinter, Playwright of the Pause, Dies at 78". The New York Times. The New York Times Company, 25 December 2008, Theater. [Web version of article listed below.]
- —. "Harold Pinter, Whose Silences Redefined Drama, Dies at 78." The New York Times 26 December 2008, national ed., sec. A: 1, A22–23. Print. [Cites "Online: A Pinter Appraisal: An audio evaluation by Ben Brantley, reviews of Mr. Pinter's plays and more". Print version of article listed above.]
- "Harold Pinter". Economist, People: Obituary. The Economist Group, 30 December 2008. ["Harold Pinter, playwright and polemicist, died on 24 December, aged 78."]
- "Harold Pinter Mourned by PEN" Archived 13 June 2011 at the Wayback Machine. English PEN, News. English Centre of International PEN, 25 December 2008. [Includes an introductory tribute written by Jonathan Heawood and a selection of messages received from around the world.]
- "Harold Pinter 1930–2008". National Theatre, Theatre News. National Theatre, 29 December 2008.
- "Harold Pinter 1930–2008: Great Playwright, Nobel Laureate – and TLS Cricketer". Times Literary Supplement. News International (News Corporation), 29 December 2008.
- "Harold Pinter: One of the Most Influential British Playwrights of Modern Times". Telegraph, Telegraph Media Group, 26 December 2008.
- "Harold Pinter Tribute". Granta. Granta, 25 December 2008.
- "In Memoriam: Harold Pinter". The Pinter Centre for the Study of Performance and Creative Writing, Goldsmiths, University of London. Goldsmiths College, University of London, 2008.
- Jacobson, Howard. "Opinion: Howard Jacobson: Harold Pinter Didn't Get My Joke, and I Didn't Get Him – Until It Was Too Late" Archived 18 January 2012 at the Wayback Machine. Independent. Independent News and Media, 10 January 2009.
- Jamieson, Alastair. "Nobel Laureate Playwright Harold Pinter Dies". Telegraph. Telegraph Media Group, 26 December 2008.["Harold Pinter, the Nobel Prize-winning playwright and political activist, has died of liver cancer aged 78." (Includes links to several other related articles.)]
- Kamm, Oliver. "Harold Pinter: An Impassioned Artist Who Lost Direction on the Political Stage". Times. News International (News Corporation), 26 December 2008.
- Lafferty, Julia. "Pinter – A Man of Principle". Hackney Gazette, Letters. Archant, 7 January 2009.
- Marowitz, Charles. "Harold Pinter: 1930–2008". Swans, Commentary. Swans, 29 December 2008 – 1 January 2009.
- McCallum, John. "Companies Recall Good Ghost of Pinter". Australian. News Limited, 2 February 2009.
- Miller, Lionel. "The Lost Librarian." The Clove's Lines: The Newsletter of The Clove Club: The Old Boys of Hackney Downs School 3.2 (Mar. 2009): 5. Print.
- Morgan, Clare (28 January 2009). "Festival Joins Forces for Free Pinter Tribute". Sydney Morning Herald. Fairfax Digital.
- "MP Backs Pinter Tribute Campaign". Hackney Gazette, News. Archant, 27 & 28 January 2009.
- "Obituary: Harold Pinter". BBC News. BBC, 25 December 2008.
- Sands, Sarah. "Opinion: Sarah Sands: Pinter's Funeral – More Final Reckoning Than Reconciliation". Independent. Independent News and Media, 4 January 2009.
- Sherwin, Adam. "Portrait of Harold Pinter Playing Cricket To Be Sold at Auction". Times. News International, 24 March 2009.
- Smith, Alastair. "Pinter to be Honoured Before Final Performance of No Man's Land". Stage, News. Stage Newspaper Group Ltd, 2 January 2009.
- Soros, Simon. "Grandpa". Sunday Times. News International (News Corporation), 11 January 2009. (© Simon Soros 2008). [See hyperlinked account by Driscoll listed above and The Pinter Review publication listed below.]
- —. "Grandpa." The Pinter Review: Nobel Prize/Europe Theatre Prize Volume: 2005–2008. Ed. Francis Gillen with Steven H. Gale. Tampa: U of Tampa P, 2008.
- Stothard, Peter. "Harold Pinter: Exit a Master". Times Literary Supplement (TLS. News International (News Corporation), 7 January 2009. [Rpt. from blog of TLS ed. Peter Stothard; first posted on 25 December 2008.]
- Supple, Barry. "Harold Pinter – Some Memories." The Clove's Lines: The Newsletter of The Clove Club: The Old Boys of Hackney Downs School 3.2 (Mar. 2009): 6–7. Print. [This memorial tribute consists of "edited excerpts" from Supple's autobiography, Doors Open (Cambridge, Eng.: Asher, 2008). ISBN 978-0-9560057-0-0. Print.]
- Taylor, Jean (Hersh). "Of Harold Pinter and Joseph Brearley." The Clove's Lines: The Newsletter of The Clove Club: The Old Boys of Hackney Downs School 3.2 (Mar. 2009): 18. Print.
- Taylor-Batty, Mark, comp. "In Memoriam: Harold Pinter". Harold Pinter Society Webpages. The Harold Pinter Society, 1 January 2009. ["Harold Pinter – playwright, poet, actor, director, political activist – died on 24 December 2008, aged 78 ... Here are a few of the obituaries and commentaries released by the international press and online theatre community." (Contains "Key links" and a hyperlinked "Full list" periodically being updated.)]
- Thomas, Edward. "Theatre Talk with Edward Thomas: The End of the Pauses." The Clove's Lines: The Newsletter of The Clove Club: The Old Boys of Hackney Downs School 3.2 (Mar. 2009): 9. Print. [Rpt. by permission of Theatre Monthly Encore.]
- "Times Obituary: Harold Pinter". Times. News International (News Corporation), 25 December 2008.
- Ulaby, Neda. "Remembrances: Remembering Influential Playwright Harold Pinter". Day to Day. National Public Radio, 25 December 2008. [Includes audio clip.]
- Wainwright, Hilary. "In Words and Silences". Red Pepper. Red Pepper magazine, Dec. 2008. ["Hilary Wainwright reflects on Harold Pinter and Red Pepper."]
- Walker, Peter, David Smith, and Haroon Siddique. "Harold Pinter: Tributes Pour In After Death of Dramatist Aged 78". Guardian.co.uk. Guardian Media Group, 26 December 2008. ["Multi-award winning playwright lauded by dignitaries of theatrical and political spheres. … Tributes are being paid to the playwright Harold Pinter today from both the theatrical and political worlds after his death from cancer, aged 78."]
- Watkins, G. L. "Harold Pinter, CH, CBE. 10th October 1930 – 24th December 2008 (Hackney Downs School, 1942–1948, Hammond House, Prefect)," "Memorable Phrasings," and "Elsewhere in the World." The Clove's Lines: The Newsletter of The Clove Club: The Old Boys of Hackney Downs School 3.2 (Mar. 2009): 4; 8; 11. Print.
- —, ed. The Clove's Lines: The Newsletter of The Clove Club: The Old Boys of Hackney Downs School 3.2 (Mar. 2009): 1–36. Print. [This issue contains several memorial tributes to Pinter and to other departed former classmates; on Pinter, see Baker, Miller, Supple, Taylor, Thomas, Yeates, and Watkins.]
- "West End Pays Tribute to Pinter". BBC News. BBC, 27 December 2008. [Includes video clip.]
- Westwood, Matthew. "Blanchett Stars in Free Play". Australian. News Limited, 27 January 2009.
- Winer, Linda. "Nobel Laureate Harold Pinter Dead at 78". Newsday. Newsday Inc., 25 December 2008.
- Yeates, Binnie (Yankovitch). "Harold Pinter – Romeo – 1948". Rpt. in "Romeo," by Jamie Andrews. Harold Pinter Archive Blog. British Library, 20 & 25 April 2009. Rpt. from "Harold Pinter Romeo and Juliet – 1948." The Clove's Lines: The Newsletter of The Clove Club: The Old Boys of Hackney Downs School 3.2 (Mar. 2009): 8. Print. [Reproduced with permission of the author.]

== See also ==
- Characteristics of Harold Pinter's work
- Works of Harold Pinter
