= The Birthday Party (1968 film) =

1968 British film by William Friedkin

- Theatrical release poster
- Directed by: William Friedkin
- Written by: Harold Pinter
- Based on: stage play The Birthday Party by Pinter
- Produced by: Max Rosenberg; Milton Subotsky
- Starring: Robert Shaw; Patrick Magee; Sydney Tafler; Dandy Nichols
- Cinematography: Denys Coop
- Edited by: Antony Gibbs
- Production company: Palomar Pictures International
- Distributed by: Continental Distributing
- Release dates: 9 December 1968 (USA); 12 February 1970 (UK)
- Running time: 124 minutes
- Country: United Kingdom
- Language: English
- Budget: $640,000
- Box office: $400,000

The Birthday Party is a 1968 British drama neo noir directed by William Friedkin and starring Robert Shaw. It is based on the 1957 play The Birthday Party by Harold Pinter. The screenplay for the film was written by Pinter as well. The film, and the play, are considered examples of "comedy of menace", a genre associated with Pinter.

The film was a passion project for Friedkin, an admirer of the play, and he remained proud of the film after its release, though it was a box office disappointment. It influenced his later work, particularly The Exorcist.

== Plot ==
A man in his late 30s named Stanley is staying at a seaside boarding house, when he is visited by two menacing and mysterious strangers, Goldberg and McCann. Stanley's neighbour, Lulu, brings a parcel containing a boy's toy drum, which his landlady, Meg, presents to Stanley as his "birthday present."

Goldberg and McCann offer to host Stanley's birthday party after Meg tells them that it is Stanley's birthday, although Stanley protests that it is not his birthday. Through the course of the party, the actions of Goldberg and McCann eventually break down Stanley, and they take him away from the house, purportedly to get medical attention (from "Monty") in their car. Meg's husband Petey (who did not attend the party because he was out playing chess) calls after Stanley: "Stan, don't let them tell you what to do". Meg, still somewhat hung over, is unaware that Stanley has been taken away, since Petey has not told her, and she tells him that she was "the belle of the ball."

== Cast ==
- Robert Shaw as Stanley
- Patrick Magee as McCann
- Dandy Nichols as Meg
- Sydney Tafler as Goldberg
- Moultrie Kelsall as Petey
- Helen Fraser as Lulu

== Production ==
=== Development ===
The film was a passion project of director William Friedkin who called it "the first film I really wanted to make, understood and felt passionate about". He had first seen the play in San Francisco in 1962, and managed to gain funding for the film version from Edgar Scherick at Palomar Pictures, in part because it could be made relatively cheaply.

Scherick saw Friedkin's first feature Good Times and felt it "quite good, unusual." The producer admired star Robert Shaw calling him "my great love. If ever a man could love another, I love Robert Shaw. It was one of Palomar's first films. Shortly after the film version was announced a production of the play appeared on Broadway where it had a short run.

Pinter wrote the screenplay himself and was heavily involved in casting. "To this day I don't think our cast could have been improved," wrote Friedkin later.

The original choice for the part of Goldberg was Zero Mostel but he was not available.

=== Shooting ===
There was a ten-day rehearsal period and the shoot went smoothly. Friedkin says the only tense exchange he had with Pinter in a year of working together came when Joseph Losey saw the movie and requested through Pinter that Friedkin cut out a mirror shot as it was too close to Losey's style; Friedkin refused as "I wasn't about to destroy the film's continuity to mollify Losey's ego".

Max Rosenberg, best known for his horror movies for Amicus Productions, had been called in by Palomar as line producer.

"I thought The Birthday Party was going to make me a millionaire," said Friedkin. "People were going to be standing in line." "It was a different world then to what it is now," Scherick said in 1990. "There seemed a broader range of acceptance then. Certainly I expected to make money or else we wouldn't have commissioned the picture."

== Reception ==
=== Critical reception ===
The Los Angeles Times called it "a superbly funny film to watch." Variety called it an "unemotional film" with "too much dialogue".

In his film review, published in The Nation on 6 January 1969, critic Harold Clurman described the film as "a fantasia of fear and prosecution," adding that "Pinter's ear is so keen, his method so economic and so shrewdly stylized, balancing humdrum realistic notations with suggestions of unfathomable violence, that his play succeeds in being both funny and horrific".

The reviewer of the London Evening Standard observed, in a description of the film published on 12 February 1970, that the film, like the play, is "a study of domination that sows doubts, terrors, shuddering illuminations and terrifying apprehensions inside the four walls of a living-room in a seaside boarding-house where Stanley, (Robert Shaw), the lodger, has taken refuge from some guilt, crime, treachery, in fact Some Thing never named".

=== Box office ===
The film earned rentals of $50,000 in North America and $350,000 in other countries. After all costs were deducted, it recorded an overall loss of $725,000. "On the first day we did one hundred and ten dollars worth of business," recalled Sherick.

Edgar Sherick later said "I thought it was a good picture but nobody would pay any money to go see it."

"We took it out of release," said Scherick. "There was no point in spending any more money."

Friedkin later said it was "a film of which I'm proud. The cast played it to perfection. With the exception of an occasional over-the-top directorial flourish I think I captured Pinter's world. The time I spent with him and the many conversations we had were the most invaluable and instructive of my career."

== Legacy ==
Friedkin said later that Pinter's "ambiguous kind of storytelling" in the play was "more powerful than nailing things on the nose." Five years later, he followed that example in adapting William Peter Blatty's novel The Exorcist for the screen, not explaining everything happening in many scenes and leaving the film's ending less clear than Blatty had had it in his novel that good had triumphed over evil.

== See also ==
- Harold Pinter bibliography

== Notes ==
- Billington, Michael. Harold Pinter. 2nd ed. London: Faber and Faber, 2007. ISBN 978-0-571-23476-9. [Updated ed. of The Life and Work of Harold Pinter (London: Faber, 1996).]
- Clagett, Thomas D. (1990). William Friedkin : films of aberration, obsession, and reality. Jefferson, N.C.: McFarland.
- Gale, Steven H. Sharp Cut: Harold Pinter's Screenplays and the Artistic Process. Lexington: University Press of Kentucky, 2003. ISBN 0-8131-2244-9.
- –––, ed. The Films of Harold Pinter. Albany, NY: SUNY Press, 2001. ISBN 0-7914-4932-7.
- Friedkin, William, The Friedkin Connection, Harper Collins 2013
