= Comedy of manners =

Realistic, satirical genre

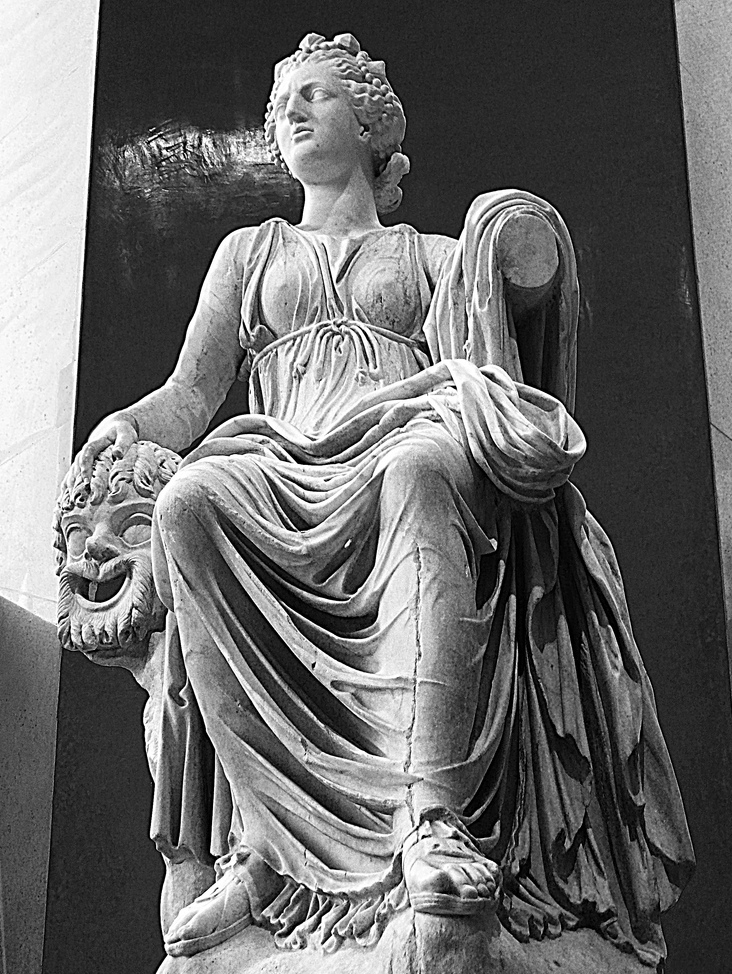
This sculpture represents Thalia, muse of comedy and Melpomene, muse of tragedy. Museo del Prado. Dates: the body was sculpted 130 - 150 A.D., the head was sculpted during the last third of the 17th century.

The comedy of manners is a genre that uses wit and intellectual dialogue to satirize the social behaviors, artificialities, and strict codes of a specific contemporary society. In this genre, the central focus is on whether characters can maintain equilibrium within exact, though often superficial, social standards. Consequently, the narrative plots, which often pertain to illicit romances or social scandals, are secondary to the sharp dialogue, cynical atmosphere, and observational commentary on human flaws. Historically, these plays were written by members of the upper classes for their own social circles and tended to flourish in societies characterized by both economic prosperity and moral permissiveness.

In English literature, the term comedy of manners (also anti-sentimental comedy) describes a genre of realistic, satirical comedy that questions and comments upon the manners and social conventions of a greatly sophisticated, artificial society. The satire of fashion, manners, and outlook on life of the social classes, is realised with stock characters, such as the braggart soldier of Ancient Greek comedy, and the fop and the rake of English Restoration comedy. The clever plot of a comedy of manners (often a scandal) is secondary to the social commentary thematically presented through the witty dialogue of the characters, e.g. The Importance of Being Earnest (1895), by Oscar Wilde, which satirises the sexual hypocrisies of Victorian morality.

The comedy-of-manners genre originated in the New Comedy period (325–260 BC) of Classical Greece (510–323 BC), and is known from fragments of works by the playwright Menander, whose style of writing, elaborate plots, and stock characters were imitated by Roman playwrights, such as Plautus and Terence, whose comedies were known to and staged during the Renaissance. In the 17th century, the comedy of manners is best realised in the plays of Molière, such as The School for Wives (1662), The Imposter (1664), and The Misanthrope (1666), which satirise the hypocrisies and pretensions of the ancien régime that ruled France from the late 15th century to the 18th century. In the early 18th century, William Congreve's play The Way of the World (1700) became popular among the public for its strong depiction of the comedy of manners genre.

== Early examples ==
The comedy of manners has been employed by Roman satirists since as early as the first century BC. Horace's Satire 1.9 is a prominent example, in which the persona is unable to express his wish for his companion to leave, but instead subtly implies so through wit.

William Shakespeare's Much Ado about Nothing might be considered the first comedy of manners in England, but the genre really flourished during the Restoration period (1660–1710). Restoration comedy, which was influenced by Ben Jonson's comedy of humours, made fun of affected wit and acquired follies of the time. The masterpieces of the genre were the plays of William Wycherley (The Country Wife, 1675) and William Congreve (The Way of the World, 1700). In the late 18th century Oliver Goldsmith (She Stoops to Conquer, 1773) and Richard Brinsley Sheridan (The Rivals, 1775; The School for Scandal, 1777) revived the form.

== Later examples ==
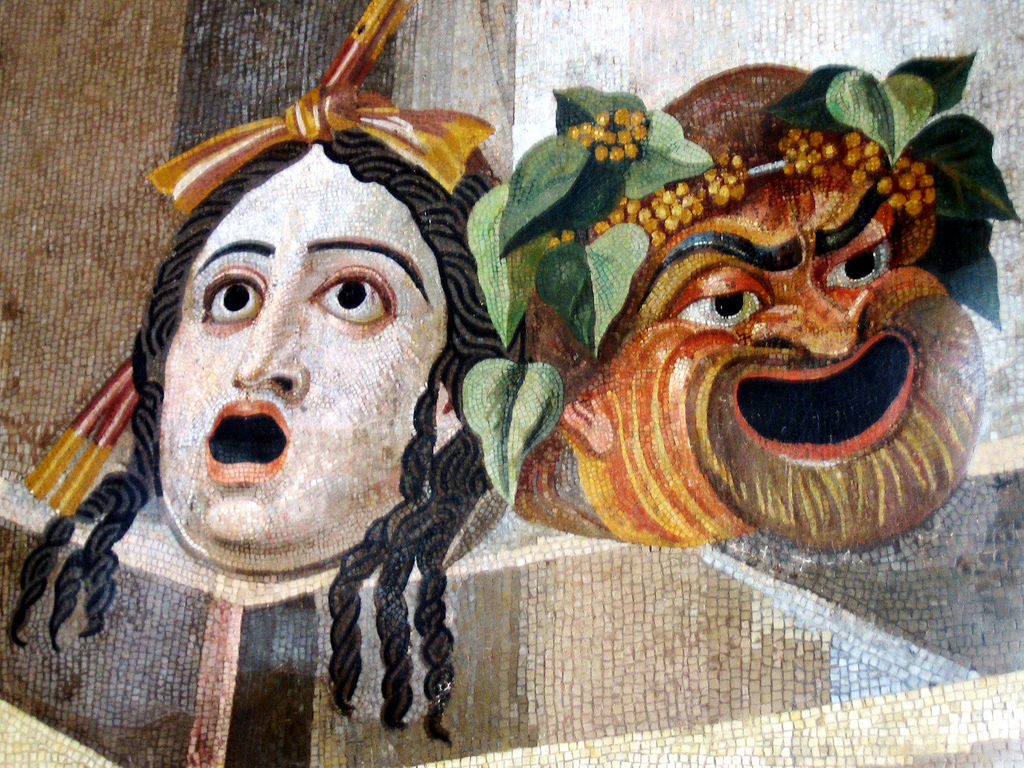
Mosaic showing theatrical masks of Tragedy and Comedy. Roman artwork, 2nd century CE.

The tradition of elaborate, artificial plotting, and epigrammatic dialogue was carried on by the Irish playwright Oscar Wilde in Lady Windermere's Fan (1892) and The Importance of Being Earnest (1895). In the 20th century, the comedy of manners reappeared in the plays of the British dramatists Noël Coward (Hay Fever, 1925) and Somerset Maugham. Other early twentieth-century examples of comedies of manners include George Bernard Shaw's 1913 play Pygmalion (later adapted into the musical My Fair Lady), E. M. Forster's A Room with a View, and the Jeeves and Wooster stories of P. G. Wodehouse.

The term comedy of menace, which British drama critic Irving Wardle based on the subtitle of The Lunatic View: A Comedy of Menace (1958), by David Campton, is a jocular play-on-words derived from the "comedy of manners" (menace being manners pronounced with a somewhat Judeo-English accent). Harold Pinter's play The Homecoming has been described as a mid-twentieth-century "comedy of manners".

More recent examples include Kazuo Ishiguro's The Remains of the Day, Barbara Pym's Excellent Women, Douglas Carter Beane's As Bees in Honey Drown, The Country Club, and The Little Dog Laughed. In the play Boston Marriage (1999), David Mamet chronicles a sexual relationship between two women, one of whom has her eye on yet another young woman (who never appears, but who is the target of a seduction scheme). Periodically, the two women make their serving woman the butt of haughty jokes, serving to point up the satire on class. Though displaying the verbal dexterity one associates with both the playwright and the genre, the patina of wit occasionally erupts into shocking crudity. Many works categorized as "comedy of manners" are novels or plays, but the genre also exists in film and television. A modern example in film is Francis Veber's The Dinner Game (1998), a French-language cult classic that was originally a play. In The Dinner Game, a group of wealthy friends host dinners to which they invite weird people so they can make fun of them. Much of the film's humor comes from the pretentiousness of the central characters. As for television, Larry David's Curb Your Enthusiasm has been described as a comedy of manners.

== See also ==
- Drawing room play
