= David Campton =

David Campton (2 May 1924 – 9 September 2006) was a prolific British dramatist who wrote plays for the stage, radio, and cinema for thirty-five years.

== Biography ==
Campton was born in Leicester, in 1924. He was educated at Wyggeston Grammar School for Boys. From 1942 to 1945, he served in the RAF, and then, for another year, in the Fleet Air Arm. He worked as a clerk in the City of Leicester Department of Education until 1949 and then moved to the East Midlands Gas Board, where he worked until 1956. Campton worked with Stephen Joseph in developing theatre in the round in the United Kingdom, and played a major role in establishing theatre-in-the-rounds in both Scarborough, North Yorkshire (now in the well-known Stephen Joseph Theatre, a converted 1930s Odeon cinema) and Staffordshire in the English West Midlands. He worked as writer, actor and also regularly ran the box-office and front-of-house. Campton always credited himself with giving a young Alan Ayckbourn one of his first jobs at Scarborough with the immortal words, 'watch me my boy and one day you might become a playwright like me!' Ayckbourn later became Artistic Director of the Stephen Joseph Theatre and an internationally renowned playwright. Campton was always keen to encourage those interested in drama, even amateurs. At the age of seventy-six, he directed and appeared in one of the plays he had previously written for Stephen Joseph at Scarborough, Passport to Florence, with a group of amateurs, ACTWS, in Leicester. This may have been his final performance on stage.

== Evaluation ==
In performance reviews published in the short-lived British drama magazine Encore of productions of Campton's play The Lunatic View: A Comedy of Menace and Harold Pinter's The Birthday Party, drama critic Irving Wardle borrowed the term "comedy of menace" from the subtitle of Campton's play, popularizing the term "comedies of menace".

Campton addressed the matter of critics' "pigeonholing" his work:

"I dislike pigeonholes and object to being popped into one. However, one label that might fit is the title of an anthology of my plays: Laughter and Fear. This is not quite the same as comedy of menace, which has acquired a connotation of theatre of the absurd. It is in fact present in my lightest domestic comedy. It seems to me that the chaos affecting everyone today––political, technical, sociological, religious, etc., etc.,––is so all-pervading that it cannot be ignored, yet so shattering that it can only be approached through comedy. Tragedy demands firm foundations; today we are dancing among the ruins." (Qtd. in "David Campton, Playwright")

== Awards ==
- First prize in a competition sponsored by the Tavistock Repertory Company
- British Arts Council bursary (1958)
- British Theatre Association prizes (1975, 1978, 1985)

== Works ==
Full-length plays

- Dead and Alive (produced 1964, published 1983)
- The Lunatic View: A Comedy of Menace (1957), which includes:
  - A Smell of Burning
  - Then ...
  - Memento Mori
  - Getting and Spending
- The Life and Death of Almost Everybody (1970; published 1971)
- Carmilla (produced 1972, published 1973)

One-act plays

- After Midnight––Before Dawn (produced 1978)
- Alison (1969) (published in Campton, David, On Stage Again London: French, 1969)
- Angel Unwilling (1966)
- Apocalypse Now And Then (1982)
- Asking (1969) (published in On Stage Again)
- At Sea (1960)
- Attitutudes (1981)
- Bacchanalia (1969) (published in On Stage Again)
- Break-up (1969) (published in On Stage Again)
- Build Up (1969) (published in On Stage Again)
- But Not Here (produced 1983, published 1984)
- The Cagebirds (produced 1971)
- The Cactus Garden (1955)
- Can You Hear the Music? (produced 1988)
- Cards, Cups and Crystal Ball (produced 1985)
- Change Partners (1952)
- Cock & Bull Story (1965)
- Come Back Tomorrow (1972)
- Comeback (a.k.a. Honey I'm Home) (1963)
- Cooked (1969) (published in On Stage Again)
- Cuckoo Song (1956)
- Dark Wings (1980)
- Do-It-Yourself-Frankenstein Outfit (produced 1975)
- Doctor Alexander (1956)
- Don't Wait For Me (1963)
- Dragons Are Dangerous (1955)
- Evergreens (produced)
- Everybody's Friend (produced 1975)
- Little Brother, Little Sister (produced 1970)
- Memento Mori (produced 1957)
- Mrs Meadowsweet (produced 1985)
- Now and Then (produced 1970)
- Our Branch in Brussels (produced 1986)
- Out of the Flying Pan (produced 1970)
- Parcel (broadcast 1968)
- Permission to Cry
- Relics (produced 1973)
- Right Place (produced 1970)
- Singing in the Wilderness (produced 1985)
- A Smell of Burning (produced 1957)
- Smile (produced 1990)
- Then (produced 1980)
- Us and Them (1972)
- What Are You Doing Here?
- Who Calls? (produced 1979)
- Winter of 1917 (produced 1989)
- Some of My Best Friends Are Smiths

Dramatic sketch

- Resting Place (produced 1969, as part of the revue entitled Mixed Doubles)

Anthologies

- Laughter and Fear (London: Blackie, 1969. ISBN 0-216-89077-2 (10). ISBN 978-0-216-89077-0 (13))
- Two in the Corner (collection of sketches, 1983)
- On Stage Again (London: French, 1969)
