= Irving Wardle =

English writer and theatre critic (1929–2023)

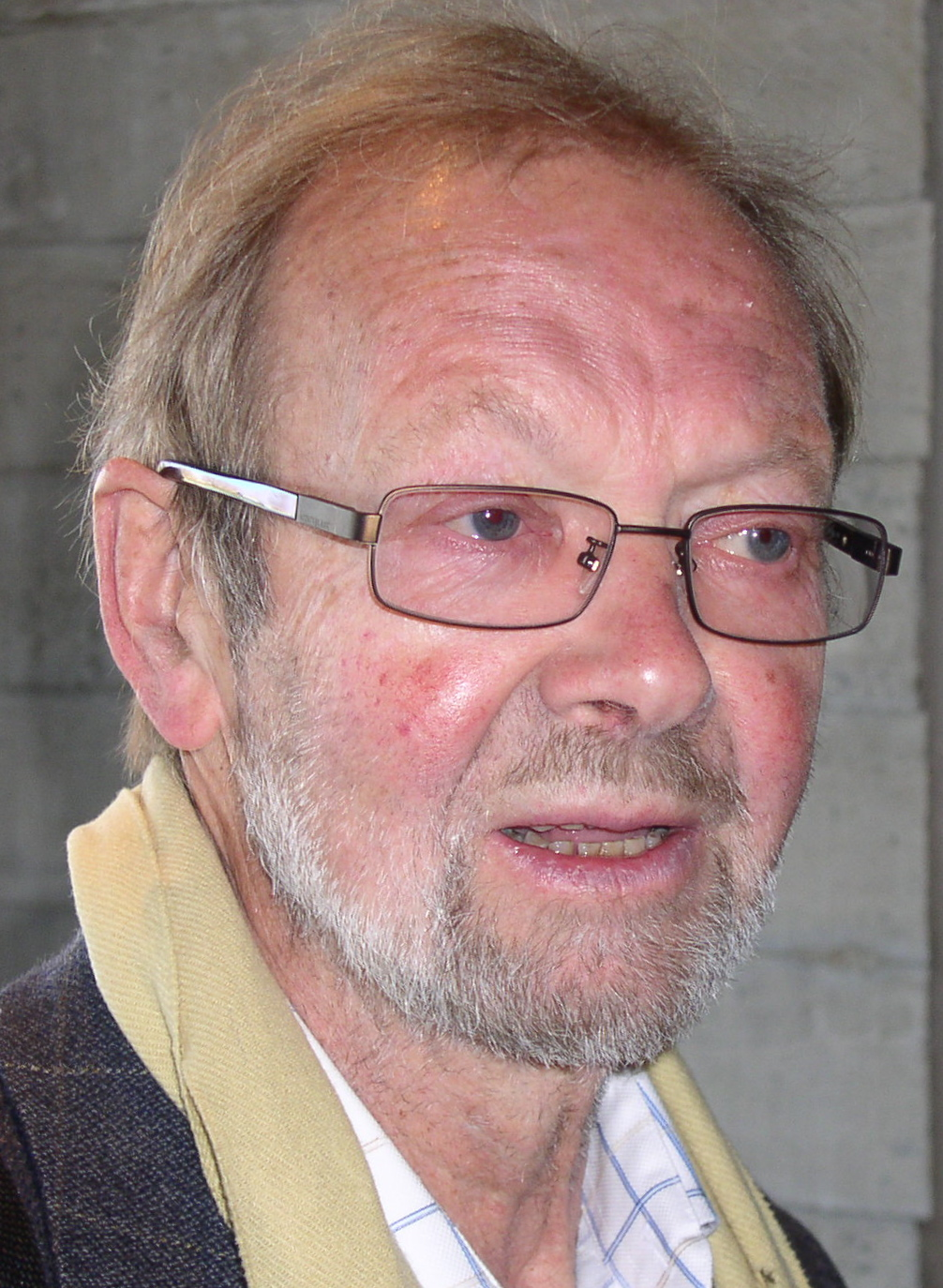
- Wardle in 2010
- Born: John Irving Wardle; 20 July 1929; Manchester, England
- Died: 23 February 2023 (aged 93)
- Education: Wadham College, Oxford; Royal College of Music
- Occupation: Theatre critic
- Spouses: Joan Notkin (m. 1958, divorced); Fay Vivian Crowder (m. 1963, divorced); Elizabeth Grist (m. 1975)
- Children: 4

John Irving Wardle (20 July 1929 – 23 February 2023) was an English theatre critic and author. He wrote about theatre for The Observer from 1959 to 1963, for The Times from 1963 to 1989, and for The Independent on Sunday from 1989 to 1995.

== Early life ==
Wardle was born on 20 July 1929 in Manchester, Lancashire, the son of John Wardle and his wife Nellie (Partington). His father was an actor who became a drama critic on the Bolton Evening News. Wardle was educated at Bolton School, Wadham College, Oxford, and the Royal College of Music. While at Oxford, Wardle participated in theatre, performing in a production of The Tempest alongside the actors Nigel Davenport and Jack May, the future directors John Schlesinger and Bill Gaskill, and Mary Moore, the future principal of St Hilda's College, Oxford.

== Work ==
Wardle's early appointments included an anonymous fortnightly review spot on the Bolton Evening News, beginning in 1958. He worked as a sub-editor on The Times Literary Supplement, as deputy theatre critic (to Kenneth Tynan) on The Observer, from 1959 to 1963, as drama critic for The Times from 1963 to 1989, editor of Gambit 1973 to 1975, and as theatre columnist for The Independent on Sunday from 1990 to 1995, when his position was eliminated amid financial cuts. Thereafter, he worked as a freelancer, and his later writing appeared in magazines such as Prospect and The Oldie.

He published two books; a biography The Theatres of George Devine (Jonathan Cape, 1978) and Theatre Criticism (Routledge, 1992). His first play, The Houseboy, was performed at the Open Space Theatre in 1973. The play is semi-autobiographical, based on Wardle's experience from a part-time job washing dishes at a London guest house. The production was directed by Charles Marowitz and the cast included Timothy West. A television production was made for ITV's Playhouse season and screened on 3 July 1982, directed by Christopher Hodson. The cast was Stephen Garlick, Geoffrey Palmer, Richard Pasco and Earl Rhodes.

== Personal life ==
Wardle's first two marriages, to Joan Notkin in 1958 and to Fay Crowder in 1963, both ended in divorce. He and Crowder had two children. In 1975, Wardle married Elizabeth Grist. They had two children and remained together until his death on 23 February 2023, aged 93.

Wardle was a close friend of Harold Pinter, for whose work he coined the phrase "comedies of menace". The two met after Wardle reviewed Pinter's The Birthday Party in 1958, and an impressed Pinter wrote to compliment him on his critical sensibility.

== Awards ==
He was honoured in 2004 at the Cairo International Festival of Experimental Theatre.
