= Ken Mandelbaum =

American columnist, critic, and author

Ken Mandelbaum is an American columnist, critic, and author whose primary field of expertise is musical theatre.

Born and raised in Brooklyn, New York, Mandelbaum was introduced to Broadway musical theatre by his parents and grandparents at an early age. He initially pursued an acting career, studying with Stella Adler and performing at the Circle in the Square Theatre and the Provincetown Playhouse.

In 1986, he began writing for Show Music magazine and the New York Native, and the following year he joined the staff of TheaterWeek. He was a frequent contributor to Playbill and wrote a regular column for Broadway.com until 2006. Before his career as a theatre writer, he was a teacher in New York public schools.

He is the author of A Chorus Line and the Musicals of Michael Bennett (St. Martin's Press, 1989, ISBN 978-0-312-03061-2) and Not Since Carrie: Forty Years of Broadway Musical Flops (St. Martin's Press, 1992, ISBN 1466843276).

The New York Times called Not Since Carrie a "must read", saying, "Mr. Mandelbaum hits all the highlights, everything from Breakfast at Tiffany's,' starring Mary Tyler Moore as Holly Golightly, to last season's Shogun: The Musical. Mr. Mandelbaum also takes a good swipe at Annie 2: Miss Hannigan's Revenge."
