= Comedy of menace =

Theatrical genre

Comedy of menace is the body of plays written by David Campton, Nigel Dennis, N. F. Simpson, and Harold Pinter. The term was coined by drama critic Irving Wardle, who borrowed it from the subtitle of Campton's play The Lunatic View: A Comedy of Menace, in reviewing Pinter's and Campton's plays in Encore in 1958. (Campton's subtitle Comedy of Menace is a jocular play-on-words derived from comedy of manners—menace being manners pronounced with somewhat of an English accent.)

== Background ==
Citing Wardle's original publications in Encore magazine (1958), Susan Hollis Merritt points out that in "Comedy of Menace" Wardle "first applies this label to Pinter's work … describ[ing] Pinter as one of 'several playwrights who have been tentatively lumped together as the "non-naturalists" or "abstractionists" ' (28)". His article "Comedy of Menace," Merritt continues,

centers on The Birthday Party because it is the only play of Pinter's that Wardle had seen [and reviewed] at the time, yet he speculates on the basis of "descriptions of [Pinter's] other plays, 'The Room' and 'The Dumb Waiter', [that Pinter] is a writer dogged by one image—the womb" (33). Mentioning the acknowledged "literary influences" on Pinter's work—"Beckett, Kafka and American gangster films"—Wardle argues that " 'The Birthday Party' exemplifies the type of comic menace which gave rise to this article." (225)

In "Comedy of Menace", as Merritt observes, on the basis of his experience of The Birthday Party and others' accounts of the other two plays, Wardle proposes that "Comedy enables the committed agents and victims of destruction to come on and off duty; to joke about the situation while oiling a revolver; to display absurd or endearing features behind their masks of implacable resolution; to meet … in paper hats for a game of blind man's buff"; he suggests how "menace" in Pinter's plays "stands for something more substantial: destiny," and that destiny, "handled in this way—not as an austere exercise in classicism, but as an incurable disease which one forgets about most of the time and whose lethal reminders may take the form of a joke—is an apt dramatic motif for an age of conditioned behaviour in which orthodox man is a willing collaborator in his own destruction".

"Just two years later" (1960), however, Wardle retracted "Comedy of Menace" in his review of The Caretaker, stating: "On the strength of 'The Birthday Party' and the pair of one-acters, I rashly applied the phrase 'comedy of menace' to Pinter's writing. I now take it back".

After Wardle's retraction of comedy of menace as he had applied it to Pinter's writing, Pinter himself also occasionally disavowed it and questioned its relevance to his work (as he also did with his own offhand but apt statement that his plays are about "the weasel under the cocktail cabinet"). For example, in December 1971, in his interview with Pinter about Old Times, Mel Gussow recalled that "After The Homecoming [Pinter] said that [he] 'couldn't any longer stay in the room with this bunch of people who opened doors and came in and went out. Landscape and Silence [the two short poetic memory plays that were written between The Homecoming and Old Times] are in a very different form. There isn't any menace at all.' " Later, when Gussow asked Pinter to expand on his view that he had "tired" of "menace", Pinter added: "when I said that I was tired of menace, I was using a word that I didn't coin. I never thought of menace myself. It was called 'comedy of menace' quite a long time ago [1958]. I never stuck categories on myself, or on any of us [playwrights]. But if what I understand the word menace to mean is certain elements that I have employed in the past in the shape of a particular play, then I don't think it's worthy of much more exploration".

Despite Wardle's retraction of comedy of menace (and Pinter's later qualifications), Comedy of menace and comedies of menace caught on and have been prevalent since the late 1950s in advertisements and in critical accounts, notices, and reviews to describe Pinter's early plays and some of his later work as well. As Merritt points out, among other examples of critics' usage of this and similar categories of Pinter's work, after Gussow's 1971 "conversation" with Pinter, "Though he echoes Wardle's concept, Gussow seems to avoid using comedy of menace when reviewing the CSC Repertory Theatre's 1988 production of The Birthday Party. While still emphasizing Pinter's 'terrors' and the 'shiver beneath the laughter,' Gussow describes the play as "a play of intrigue, with an underlying motif of betrayal' … [and] [Bernard F.] Dukore calls the play 'a comedy (of menace or otherwise)'".

== Selected examples ==
=== The Birthday Party (1958) ===
In discussing the first production of Pinter's first full-length play, The Birthday Party (1958), which followed his first play, The Room (1957), his authorised official biographer Michael Billington points out that Wardle "once excellently" described its setting (paraphrasing Wardle), as "a banal living-room [which] opens up to the horrors of modern history".

=== The Dumb Waiter (1960) ===
In Pinter's second one-act play, The Dumb Waiter (1960), as accentuated through the 2008 film by Martin McDonagh closely resembling and markedly influenced by it, In Bruges, "Pinter conveys the idea of political terror through the staccato rhythms of music-hall cross-talk and the urban thriller: Hackney Empire cross-fertilises with Hemingway's The Killers [1927]", one of Pinter's own acknowledged early influences, along with Franz Kafka (348–49); Elizabethan and Jacobean dramatists, such as William Shakespeare, John Webster, and Cyril Tourneur, whose work his schoolmaster Joseph Brearley had introduced to him; Samuel Beckett (mostly his novels [43]); and black-and-white American movies of the 1940s and 1950s.

"A near-perfect play about the testiness of a collapsing partnership and the divide-and-rule tactics of authority," according to Billington, The Dumb Waiter focuses on two characters, Gus and Ben; Gus is "the man who questions the agreed system and who is ultimately destroyed by his quest for meaning"; Ben, "the man who blindly obeys orders and thereby places himself at risk. (If the system can arbitrarily dispose of his partner, why not of him?)". As Pinter's The Dumb Waiter has been categorised as a "comedy of menace," so may be McDonagh's In Bruges, as it closely resembles it; yet, despite the comedy and the sense of threat growing out of the menace, these works of Pinter and McDonagh are, in Pinter's words to Billington, also "doing something which can be described as political". At the same time, [Pinter] had – and still [in 1996 through to the time of his death in 2008] has – an acute sense of the fragility of earthly happiness and of the terrors that haunt us even from infancy".

The "punning title" of The Dumb Waiter, Billington observes, "carries several layers of meaning": "It obviously refers to the antique serving-hatch that despatches [sic] ever more grotesque orders for food to these bickering gunmen"—the dumbwaiter; "But it also applies to Gus, who, troubled by the nature of the mission [their next job as hitmen] to realise he is its chosen target; or, indeed to Ben, who, by his total obedience to a higher authority that forces him to eliminate his partner, exposes his own vulnerability". As Gus "dumbly" awaits his fate, he may be a subservient partner who awaits orders from the "senior partner" Ben, but Ben too is subservient to The Powers That Be, a contemporary variation on Deus ex machina, manipulating both the mechanical dumbwaiter and them through its increasingly extravagant and thus comically inconvenient "orders" for increasingly exotic dishes, unnerving both of them.

Billington adds:

This being Pinter, the play has a metaphorical openness. You can interpret it as an Absurdist comedy – a kind of Godot in Birmingham – about two men passing the time in a universe without meaning or purpose. You can see it as a cry of protest against a whimsically cruel God who treats man as His plaything – even the twelve matches that are mysteriously pushed under the door have been invested with religious significance [by critics]. But it makes much more sense if seen as a play about the dynamics of power and the nature of partnership. Ben and Gus are both victims of some unseen authority and a surrogate married couple quarrelling, testing, talking past each other and raking over old times.

The comedy in this "comedy of menace" often derives from such arguments between Gus and Ben, especially the one that occurs when "Ben tells Gus to go and light the kettle," a "semantic nit-picking that is a standard part of music-hall comedy": "All the great stage and film double acts – Jewel and Warriss, Abbott and Costello – fall into this kind of verbal worrying in which the bullying 'male' straight man issues instructions which are questioned by the more literal-minded 'female' partner" —

Gus: "Light what?"
Ben: "The kettle."
Gus: "You mean the gas."
Ben: "Who does?"
Gus: "You do."
Ben (his eyes narrowing): "What do you mean, I mean the gas?"
Gus: "Well, that's what you mean, don't you? The gas."
Ben (powerfully): "If I say go and light the kettle I mean go and light the kettle."
Gus: "How can you light a kettle?"
Ben: "It's a figure of speech! Light the kettle. It's a figure of speech!"

As Billington observes further,

This kind of comic pedantry has precise echoes of the great Sid Field – ironically [since the city is the setting of this play] a Birmingham comic – who had a famous sketch in which he played a virgin of the greens being hectored by Jerry Desmonde's golf pro who would cry, in exasperation, 'When I say "Slowly Back" I don't mean "Slowly Back", I mean "Slowly Back." ' At another moment, the bullying pro would tell the hapless Sid to get behind the ball and he would vainly protest 'But it's behind all round it'. But, where in a music-hall sketch this kind of semantic by-play was its own justification, in Pinter it becomes a crucial part of the power-structure. … The pay-off comes when Gus, having dogmatically insisted that the accurate phrase is 'put on the kettle', suddenly finds an irritated Ben adopting the right usage.

"Everything" in The Dumb Waiter, Billington observes, "contributes towards a necessary end"; for, "the image, as Pete says in [Pinter's only novel] The Dwarfs, stands in exact correspondence and relation to the idea". In this example, the central image and central metaphor, the dumbwaiter, while "despatching ever more unlikely orders," serves as "both a visual gag and a metaphor for manipulative authority", and therein lies its menace. When Ben instructs Gus verbally, while practicing their "routine" for killing their next victim, he leaves out the most important line, which instructs Gus to "take out" his "gun":

[Ben frowns and presses his forehead]
Gus: "You've missed something out."
Ben: "I know. What?"
Gus: "I haven't taken my gun out, according to you."
Ben: "You take your gun out—"
Gus: "After I've closed the door."
Ben: "After you've closed the door."
Gus: "You've never missed that out before, you know that?"

The crucial significance of the omission becomes clear only at the very end of the play, when "Gus enters through the door stage-right – the one marked for the intended victim – stripped of his gun and holster"; it becomes clear that he is going to be "Ben's target", as Ben's "revolver [is] levelled at the door", though the play ends before Ben fires any shot.

=== The Caretaker (1960) ===
In an entry on Pinter for the 1969 edition of The Encyclopedia of World Drama cited by Merritt, Wardle repeats and updates some of his first perspective on comedy of menace as he had applied it initially to Pinter's writing:

Early in his writing career Pinter admitted to three influences: Franz Kafka, American gangster films, and Samuel Beckett. . . . At that time his plays, more than those of any other playwright's [sic], were responsible for the newly coined term 'comedy of menace.' This phrase certainly makes sense when applied to The Birthday Party . . . or to The Dumb Waiter. . . . But 'menace' is hardly the word for The Caretaker, and still less for subsequent plays in which Pinter increasingly exchanged his derelict settings and down-and-out characters for environments of moneyed elegance (657–58).

Despite those more-recent caveats regarding applying the phrase that he himself initially coined for Pinter's writing to The Caretaker—only the second of Pinter's full-length plays produced by then and the one that launched his career as a successful playwright in 1960 —and to Pinter's later plays, scenes in both acts of The Caretaker in which Mick confronts an unsuspecting Davies and scares him almost speechless also epitomise how comedy and menace still co-exist in Pinter's text and on Pinter's stage.

The comic aspects of this play multiply, reaching a crescendo in Mick's monologue in Act Two describing his "deepest wishes" for decorating the attic room (161, 173) and falling with Davies, a tramp taken in out of the cold by his brother, suggesting that "if" he can "just get down to Sidcup" to get his "papers" and "sort" himself "out" (113–16, 164), his refrain and excuse for everything (153, 175–79), he might just be able to accomplish Mick's hyperbolic pipe dream and "decorate the attic room out for [Mick]" (164), leading Mick to accuse Davies of misrepresenting himself as "an experienced first-class professional interior and exterior decorator" (172–74), an absurd conclusion, given the tangible evidence of the down-and-out Davies before Mick (and the audience).

Pinter's friend the late film and stage director David Jones, who directed the play for the Roundabout Theatre, in New York City, in 2003 (having previously directed Pinter's 1983 film of Betrayal, as well as other works by or featuring him), reminds his audience that Pinter himself said, in a widely quoted statement, that The Caretaker is only "funny, up to a point" and that "beyond that point" is why he wrote it:

There is always mischief lurking in the darkest corners. The world of The Caretaker is a bleak one, its characters damaged and lonely. But they are all going to survive. And in their dance to that end they show a frenetic vitality and a wry sense of the ridiculous that balance heartache and laughter. Funny, but not too funny. As Pinter wrote, back in 1960: "As far as I am concerned The Caretaker IS funny, up to a point. Beyond that point, it ceases to be funny, and it is because of that point that I wrote it." (Jones)

"Beyond the point" of the comedy (the "funny") lies the scary territory that threatens one's very existence, which Wardle and others commonly have "labeled" or "pigeonholed" (depending on one's perspective) as "menace".

=== Pinter's later plays ===
Though "comedy of menace" is generally applied to Pinter's early work of the late 1950s through the middle of the 1960s, including The Collection (1961), The Lover (1963), Tea Party (1965, 1968), and The Homecoming (1965), even Pinter's late plays, like Ashes to Ashes (1996) and Celebration (2000), his last two full-length stage plays, exhibit his characteristic amalgam of the comic and the menacing, a sense of threat or impending doom; there is less comedy and more menace in Ashes to Ashes, in which heavy echoes of the Holocaust predominate; a more comedy than menace in Celebration, where heightened comic dialogue outweighs the frightening undercurrents of terror, the terrifying, or the terrible.

=== Celebration (2000) ===
While reviewers and other audience members describe Celebration as hilarious ("one of Pinter's funniest plays", according to Billington), the nature of the relationships of two sets of diners (three couples) having dinner in an upscale restaurant (which some critics assume that Pinter modeled on The Ivy, in London's West End) – "this is the best and most expensive restaurant in the whole of Europe" – remains characteristically ambiguous; Billington describes one set of couples as "a strangely rootless bunch with a depleted sense of family".

One set (the two couples seated at Table One) consists of brothers Lambert and Matt and their wives, Prue and Julie, who are sisters; the second set of diners (the couple seated at Table Two) consists of a banker and his young wife, Suki, who comically turns out to have had an affair with Lambert when she was 18.

As the "maître d'hôtel" emits platitudes geared to elevate the nouveaux riches in their own imagined esteem ("I believe the concept of this restaurant rests in that public house of my childhood"), the "maîtress d'hôtel" appears to dwell on a peculiar past family and sex life, while the Waiter engages in "interjections" spinning fantasied impossible memories of a grandfather who knew writers, other artists, and various other public figures of multiple decades and geographical locations too far apart to have been experienced personally in one man's lifetime.

Lambert and Matt reveal themselves to be rather uncouth bullies ("Teddy boys", according to some London reviews)—who describe themselves as "consultants … Strategy consultants. … It means we don't carry guns. … We don't have to! … We're peaceful strategy consultants. … Worldwide. Keeping the peace. Strategy consultant could be a euphemistic catchall for warmonger, manager of terrorism, purveyor of counter-terrorism, or orderer of covert operations.

[Lambert's mobile phone rings]
Lambert: "Who the fuck's this?"
[He switches it on]
Lambert: "Yes? What?" (He listens briefly.) "I said no calls! It's my fucking wedding anniversary!"
[He switches it off]
Lambert: "Cunt."

As the banker Russell interprets their explanation, peaceful strategy consultants seems vaguely menacing: "We need more people like you. Taking responsibility. Taking charge. Keeping the peace. Enforcing the peace. Enforcing peace. We need more like you". This speech stressing "force" (in the repetitions of Enforcing) occurs after Russell has already revealed his own ilk:

Russell: "Look at me. I'm basically a totally disordered personality; some people would describe me as a psychopath." (to Suki) "Am I right?"
Suki: "Yes."
Russell: "But when I'm sitting in this restaurant I suddenly find I have no psychopathic tendencies at all. I don't feel like killing everyone in sight, I don't feel like putting a bomb under everyone's arse. I feel something quite different, I have a sense of equilibrium, of harmony, I love my fellow diners. Now this is very unusual for me. Normally I feel—as I've just said—absoute malice and hatred towards everyone within spitting distance—but here I feel love. How do you explain it?"
Suki: "It's the ambience."

Lambert and Matt are distantly reminiscent of Gus and Ben from The Dumb Waiter; but distinctly less polite while living much higher on the hog. One imagines such characters "strategically" plotting the "peaceful" rendition of others without any qualms while sipping Perrier and simultaneously planning their next wedding-anniversary dinner celebration (perhaps with a different set of wives) on their mobiles.

As the Waiter says in his apparently penultimate "interjection", in which one might detect intimations of mortality:

Waiter: "My grandfather introduced me to the mystery of life and I'm still in the middle of it. I can't find the door to get out. My grandfather got out of it. He left it behind him and he didn't look back.
He got that absolutely right.
And I'd like to make one further interjection."
[He stands still.]
[Slow fade.]

=== "Apart From That" (Sketch) (2006) ===
Pinter mocks mobile phones comically in an ostensibly-trivial wireless conversation, while still suggesting a residual bit of menace in the unsaid, developed as his last revue sketch Apart From That (2006). As Billington observes, this dramatic sketch inspired by Pinter's strong aversion to mobile phones is "very funny", but "as two people trade banalities over their mobile phones[,] there is a hint of something ominous and unspoken behind the clichéd chat", as illustrated in the following excerpt:

Gene: "How are you?"
Lake: "Very well. And you? Are you well?"
Gene: "I'm terribly well. How about you?"
Lake: "Really well. I'm really well."
Gene: "I'm so glad."
Lake: "Apart from ... oh you know ..."
Gene: "I know."
Lake: "Apart from ... oh you know ..."
Gene: "I do know. But apart from that ...?"
Lake: "How about you?"
Gene: "Oh you know ... all things considered ..."
Lake: "I know. But apart from that ...?"
Gene: "Sorry. I've lost you. [...]"

== See also ==
- Comedy of manners
- Film noir
- Grotesque
- Kafkaesque
- Music hall
- Theatre of the Absurd
- Vaudeville

== Works cited ==
- Billington, Michael (2007) [1996]. Harold Pinter. London: Faber and Faber. ISBN 978-0-571-23476-9. [Updated 2nd ed. of The Life and Work of Harold Pinter. 1996. London: Faber and Faber, 1997. ISBN 0-571-17103-6 (10).]
- Gussow, Mel (1994). Conversations with Pinter. London: Nick Hern Books. ISBN 1-85459-201-7. Rpt. New York: Limelight, 2004. ISBN 0-87910-179-2.
- Jones, David. "Travels with Harold". Front & Center Online ("The Online Version of Roundabout Theatre Company's Subscriber Magazine"). Roundabout Theatre Company, Fall 2003. (3 pages.) Web. 9 Oct. 2007.
- Merritt, Susan Hollis. Pinter in Play: Critical Strategies and the Plays of Harold Pinter. Rpt. with a new preface. Durham and London: Duke UP, 1995. ISBN 0-8223-1674-9 (10). ISBN 978-0-8223-1674-9 (13).
- Pinter, Harold. "Apart From That". Areté 20 (Spring/Summer 2006): 5–8.
- –––. The Birthday Party, The Caretaker, and Celebration. In The Essential Pinter. New York: Grove Press, 2006. ISBN 0-8021-4269-9 (10). ISBN 978-0-8021-4269-6. (Parenthetical references to this edition of the three plays appear in the text.)
- –––. The Caretaker and The Dumb Waiter: Two Plays by Harold Pinter. 1960. New York: Grove Press, 1988. ISBN 0-8021-5087-X (10). ISBN 978-0-8021-5087-5 (13). (Parenthetical citations to The Dumb Waiter in the text are from this ed. of the play, which is accessible online via Google Books "limited preview". It was reissued again with a new cover after Pinter won the 2005 Nobel Prize in Literature.)
- Wardle, Irving. "The Birthday Party". Encore 5 (July–Aug. 1958): 39–40. Rpt. in The Encore Reader: A Chronicle of the New Drama. Ed. Charles Marowitz, Tom Milne, and Owen Hale. London: Methuen, 1965. 76–78. (Reissued as: New Theatre Voices of the Fifties and Sixties. London: Eyre Methuen, 1981.)
- –––. "Comedy of Menace". Encore 5 (Sept. – Oct. 1958): 28–33. Rpt. in The Encore Reader and New Theatre Voices 86–91.
- –––. "There's Music in That Room". Encore 7 (July–Aug. 1960): 32–34. Rpt. in The Encore Reader and New Theatre Voices 129–32.
