= Open Space Theatre =

Coordinates: 51.5180°N 0.1322°W

The Open Space Theatre was a professional created by Charles Marowitz and Thelma Holt in 1968. It began in a basement on Tottenham Court Road in London, then transferred to an art deco post office on the Euston Road in 1976. Thelma attracted a team of volunteer architects and workers to build the theatre (including David Schofield). The first production was Charles Marowitz's adaptation of the Merchant of Venice ('The Merchant') starring Vladek Sheybal and in July 1969 Natasha Pyne played Ophelia in Marowitz's adaptation of Shakespeare's 'Hamlet'. The company operated until around 1980.

Jinnie Schiele's book (University of Hertfordshire Press, 2006) relates the history of the Open Space with that of Holt's later venue, the Roundhouse.
