= TheaterWeek =

Defunct magazine about theater and cabaret based in the U.S.

- Front cover from February 5, 1996
- Editor: Mike Salinas, Bob Sandia and John Harris
- Categories: Theatre
- Frequency: Weekly
- Publisher: Charles Ortleb
- Total circulation: 56,000 (1997)
- First issue: 1987
- Final issue: 1997
- Company: That New Magazine, Inc.
- Country: United States
- Based in: New York City
- Language: English
- ISSN: 0896-1956
- OCLC: 16987637

TheaterWeek was a national weekly magazine catering to artists and lovers of theater and cabaret. It covered Broadway, off-Broadway, regional and educational theater with articles that included profiles and interviews of actors, directors and designers, reviews, theater news and behind-the-scenes looks at shows. The magazine was founded and first edited by Mike Salinas. Later, Bob Sandia and then John Harris edited the magazine. Columnists such as Peter Filichia, Alexis Greene, Charles Marowitz, Ken Mandelbaum, Davi Napoleon, Leslie (Hoban) Blake, and Michael Riedel were featured. The New York Daily News called the magazine "influential".

== History and legacy ==
The magazine was published from August 1987 to January 1997, when it closed amid financial struggles. Its columnists went on to write for such other magazines and internet sites as Playbill, InTheater, TheaterMania.com and Broadway.com.

The publication was known for having "a heap of wisdom ... by the devoted denizens of Shubert Alley and off-Broadway" and often commented that other theater reviewers had the ability to "make or break" a production, seeing itself as a neutral source in the theater world. The magazine was recommended (along with New York Magazine) as an essential guide for tourists to theater in New York City. Long-time reviewer Peter Filichia's columns often appeared in the publication.

In 1992, the magazine "blasted" New York Times theater critic Alex Witchel. The editor of TheaterWeek at the time, John Harris, was seeking Witchel's job when it was announced that she was leaving the Times. Harris had tried to get Witchel to work for TheaterWeek years before but was not successful. The pair had reportedly been feuding for some time, and the tone of the article was seen as unfair, and talk of potential legal action over the claims was reported. The penultimate issue of TheaterWeek reportedly "infuriated a lot of Broadway people" when the publisher, Chuck Ortleb, ran an article for his own not-yet-completed play about the AIDS pandemic; Ortleb would use TheaterWeek and his other publications to "[lampoon] a new enemy and [publicize] a new theory, no matter how implausible". Ortleb was reportedly using TheaterWeek to prop up his other two publications (The New York Native and Christopher Street). Ortleb did allow staffers at the magazine a wide degree of freedom compared to his other publications, but Week was in decline near the end; the magazine's circulation fell below 20,000 at that time, and they had difficulty paying their bills and making payroll (some staff members recall not getting paid in over a year or rarely seeing a paycheck clear).

After the magazine closed, its assets were purchased by Playbill.
