= David Schofield =

David Schofield may refer to:

- David Schofield (actor) (born 1951), English actor
- David Schofield (footballer) (born 1981), English footballer
