= M. C. Gardner =

American dramatist

M. C. Gardner is an American playwright, biographer, and cultural essayist. His given name is Michael Charles. He was born in Glendale, CA July 1, 1951. He is one of the founders and editors of the literary website AnotherAmerica.org. He currently resides in Los Angeles, CA.

== Career ==
Gardner's first two plays The Man from Lloyds and A Presley Passion were published in May 2021 as a book called Eliot and Elvis in anticipation of the One Hundredth Anniversary of T.S. Eliot's 1922 publication of The Waste Land. The Man from Lloyds concerns itself with the dynamic between the T.S. Eliot and his first wife, Vivenne Haigh-Wood and their relationship with Bertrand Russell. A Presley Passion considers the relationship between Elvis and his manager, Colonel Tom Parker. Both plays use music and lyric to develop their respective themes and characters. The Man from Lloyds features the songs of Eliot's contemporary, Al Jolson. A Presley Passion features the Presley song book.

Gardner's The Tautological Paradigm is a structural analysis of Western thought and Eastern scripture. It demonstrates a nexus between the Jewish Tanakh, Vedanta's Upanishads and Bhagavad Gita and Hua-Yen School of Buddhism's Gandavyuha Sutra and the 7th century's Chinese Patriarchs, Tu-Shun and Fa-tsang, dilations of its tautologies. He has worked on the book for three decades continues in the editing process of a huge collection of materials.

Gardner's 2 Volume, two-thousand-page compendium on Walt Whitman, Whitman's Code: A New Bible was published by Patcheny Press. Volume I was issued in July 2013. Volume II was released in February 2015. Whitman was both a public persona: "Walt Whitman, a Kosmos, of Manhattan the son," and a retiring private one. He called his interior persona the Me myself: "I have not once had the least idea who or what I am." The first was bold enough to self-publish and self-review the work he offered to his public; the second was known to resort to code to disguise his interior agendas. The most famous of his codes was "16.4". P is the 16th letter of the alphabet as D is the 4th. PD = Peter Doyle, the streetcar driver that he met after the war and with whom he developed a deep emotional attachment.

The basis for Whitman's Code: A New Bible was another Whitman Code. It was first discovered by his friend, R.M. Bucke in a notebook to which his was entrusted as one of the three executors of the poet's estate. Fragment 14 read: "The Great Construction of the New Bible. Not to be diverted from the principal—the main life work—the three hundred and sixty-five--it ought to be ready in 1859." Bucke conjectured the fragment was written in 1857. 1860's 3rd edition of Leaves of Grass contained 136 poems. The poet also began the program of grouping poems in thematic clusters. He numbered stanzas to give them the appearance of Biblical verse but later dropped the conceit. He made no further reference to the project of coupling his poems to the 365 days of the year as if an "American" Book of Common Prayer. It was thought to be an early organizational plan that was subsequently abandoned in his development of the clusters that grouped his poems in the various succeeding editions of Leaves of Grass.

Gardner noted that there were two types of poems in Whitman's Collection. The Solo poems and those grouped in Clusters. These solo poems Gardner called Canticles after an 1889 reference by the poet in the essay A Backward Glance O'er Travel'd Roads. These were major poems that could stand alone (Song of Myself, The Sleepers etc.). The poems of the Clusters and Annexes were thematically related. The only odd group in the Whitman Canon were the poems that were added to editions after the poet's death, by executor Horace Traubel: "Old Age Echoes."

Gardner simply ran the numbers. He discovered that when the 25 "Canticles" and the posthumous 13 "Old Age Echoes," were subtracted from the Canonical Count of 402, the remainder was the suggestive total of 364. In the Deathbed Edition of 91/92 Whitman returned an earlier Epigraph, "Come said my Soul" to the title page with a facsimile his signature. The poet concluded his life and work by signing off on the completion of an early design of a New Bible—"the main life work—the three hundred and sixty-five." Gardner points to the poet's instruction that no additional poems be added to the total of the Deathbed collection: I place upon you the injunction that whatever may be added the Leaves shall be supplementary, avowed as such, leaving the book complete as I left it, consecutive to the point I left off, making always an unmistakable, deep down, unobliterable division line.

Gardner's compendium is minimally invasive to the poet's overall scheme. The Deathbed collection is complete—deleted poems (when included) are duly noted. The order of the clusters and the poems within the clusters constitute over 93% of Whitman's poems. These remain exactly as the poet had decreed and are the basis of Book II. The 25 Solo Poems are collected into a cluster of their own—Book I of Whitman's Code: A New Bible. Gardner's compendium is predicated on the poet's preoccupation with Time: I accept time absolutely. The 52 Cantos of Song of Myself and the 365 Clustered poems mirror each other—the singular Walt Whitman reflected in the multiples of the poet's year. The remaining 24 "Canticles" suggest Whitman's day: I see something of God each hour of the 24 and Duly the 24 hours appear in public each day —each hour reflective of God and appearing in public each day. As a final proof of the importance the 365 to the poet's final tally of poems, Gardner discovered that his count of 365 was also replicated by Whitman in his own presentation of his Deathbed Edition order. If one simply considered the first cluster or Inscriptions to be a Preface (each of the twenty-four Inscriptions suggest the poet's major themes and the concluding poem is addressed to the reader and concludes: Therefore to thee the following chants) then the 365 count precisely follows without interruption from the first day of Starting from Paumanok to the last poem, the 365th day of Goodbye My Fancy. Gardner acknowledges Whitman's count in an Addendum to Volume II entitled For Walt.

Walt Whitman, The Mickle Street Vampire examines the influence of Whitman's sex poems (Children of Adam & Calamus) on the imagination of Bram Stoker in his creation of his signature character, Count Dracula. Stoker revered the poet upon reading William Michael Rossetti's 1868 presentation of his poems. He corresponded with him in the 1870s and thrice visited Whitman in the 1880s. The Stoker/Whitman Locus is suggested in a close examination of Whitman's celebrated paeans to death with numerous passages from Stoker's 1897 novel, Dracula.

Whitman and Gardner's Witness to War examines the friendship and thematic tropes between the poetry of Whitman and the portrait and war photography of Alexander Gardner. During the course of his research, he discovered that he and Alexander Gardner shared a distant progenitor: "I went in search of a photographer and found a noble kinsman."

The six volumes of Walt Whitman's Whisper were issued in 2019 by Another America Press for the Two Hundredth Anniversary of the poet's 1819 birth. The set comprises Volume I: Being & Time, Volume II: 36 Sex Poems, Volume III: 25 Drum-Taps Poems, Volume IV: Lilacs & Lincoln, Volume V: Sea-Drift & Death and Volume 6: Clusters & Annexes.

== Plays ==
- "The Man from Lloyds" Journal Lightning Source, Inc. http://anotheramerica.org/Eliot's_Breakdown.htm & http://anotheramerica.org/electric_therapy.htm
- "A Presley Passion" The Lost Studio, Hollywood CA May & July (2006) Featuring Dave Parke as Colonel Tom Parker

== Cultural analysis ==
- "Buddha Boogie: The Tautological Paradigm" Intro. & Chap 1 http://anotheramerica.org/buddha_boogie.htm
- "Buddha Boogie: The Tautological Paradigm" Chap. 3 http://anotheramerica.org/the_eyes_of_death.htm
- "Buddha Boogie: The Tautological Paradigm" Chap. 5 http://anotheramerica.org/Time_and_Proust.htm
- "Of Sons and Scions" (Henry Adams and George W. Bush at the inception of their respective centuries.) http://anotheramerica.org/M.C._Gardner's_Of_Sons_and_Scions.htm

== Literary essays ==
- Homer "The Maker" AnotherAmerica.org http://anotheramerica.org/M.C._Gardner's_Homer_Essays.htm
- Homer "Ilium's Distant Shores AnotherAmerica.org http://anotheramerica.org/homer_part_2.htm
- Homer "The Passion of a Queen" AnotherAmerica.org http://anotheramerica.org/homer_part_3.htm
- Homer "A Gathering of Shades" AnotherAmerica.org http://anotheramerica.org/homer_part_4.htm
- Plato "Shadow Dance" AnotherAmerica.org http://anotheramerica.org/plato.htm
- Shakespeare "As Any Stone" AnotherAmerica.org http://anotheramerica.org/M.C._Gardner's_Falstaff_Essay.htm
- Shakespeare "Othello" Lightning Source, Inc 2003 http://anotheramerica.org/M.C._Gardner's_Othello_Essay.htm
- Tolstoy "Life With Leo" http://anotheramerica.org/life_with_leo.htm
- Proust "Takes a Licking and..." Quantum Cotillion, Part 1, Buddha Boogie
- Mann "Crime and Will in Mann" http://anotheramerica.org/thomas_mann.htm

== Biblical essays ==
- Genesis "Mr. Jones" Part 2 Buddha Boogie http://anotheramerica.org/M.C._Gardner's_History_of_the_Bible.htm
- Book of Job "Pasteboard Masks" Part 2 Buddha Boogie http://anotheramerica.org/M.C._Gardner's_Job_Essay.htm
- Ecclesiastes and Isaiah "An Ancient Voice" Part 2 Buddha Boogie http://anotheramerica.org/Ecclesiastes_and_Isaiah.htm

== Literary criticism ==
- Donald Freed's "Patient #1":Apocalypse Nation http://www.anotheramerica.org/apocalypsenation.htm
- Harold Pinter's "War" Another America Journal, Lightning Source, Inc. 2003 http://anotheramerica.org/harold_pinter's_war.htm
- A.J. Langguth's "Jesus Christs" http://anotheramerica.org/Langguth's_Jesus_Christs_Review.htm
- Donald Freed's "Every Third House" AnotherAmerica.org Oct. 2005 http://anotheramerica.org/house_review.htm
- Leon Katz's "Classical Monologues" AnotherAmerica.org Nov. 2002
- J. Ferguson's Farley's Jewel "Facets of a Jewel" http://anotheramerica.org/Farley's_Jewel_Review.htm
- J. Ferguson's The Anthropologist Review http://anotheramerica.org/Jon_Ferguson's_The_Anthropologist.htm
- Aimee Liu's "Flash House" AnotherAmerica.org Dec. 2003 http://anotheramerica.org/flash_house.htm
- Ronald Harwood Photo Essay http://anotheramerica.org/ronald_harwood.htm
- Marc Germain Photo Essay http://anotheramerica.org/Marc_Germain_Returns.htm
- Jon Farris Photo Essay http://anotheramerica.org/jon_farris.htm

== Theatrical criticism ==
- Enrico Fink's "Lokshen--Patrilineare" Skirball Cultural Center March 2002
- "Donald Freed Plays" Broadway Play Publishing Inc. 2003 http://anotheramerica.org/Freed_Plays_Overview.htm
- The White Crow" Intro. Broadway Play Publishing Inc. 2003 http://anotheramerica.org/Crow_intro.htm
- The Devil's Advocate" Intro. Broadway Play Publishing Inc. 2003 http://anotheramerica.org/M.C._Gardner%20Intro.htm
- How Shall We Be Saved" Intro. Broadway Play Publishing Inc. 2003 http://anotheramerica.org//How_Saved.htm
- Donald Freed's Adaptation of Tolstoy's The Death of Ivan Ilych http://anotheramerica.org/life_with_leo.htm
- Susan Hussey's "The Toxic Wave" University of Tampa Press

== Art criticism ==
- An Appreciation: The Art of Bruno Mascolo https://web.archive.org/web/20080402033111/http://www.brunomascolo.com/home.html

== Biography ==
- Whitman's Code: A New Bible http://www.anotheramerica.org/the_whitman_code.htm
- Walt Whitman, The Mickle Street Vampire http://www.anotheramerica.org
