= The Birthday Party (play) =

1958 play by Harold Pinter

Cover of first edition (London: Encore Publishing, 1959)

The Birthday Party is the first full-length play by Harold Pinter, first performed in 1958 and first published in 1959. It is one of Pinter's best-known and most frequently performed plays.

In the setting of a rundown seaside boarding house, a little birthday party is turned into a nightmare when two sinister strangers arrive unexpectedly. The play has been classified as a comedy of menace, characterised by Pinteresque elements such as ambiguous identity, confusions of time and place, and dark political symbolism.

Pinter began writing The Birthday Party in the summer of 1957 while touring in Doctor in the House. He later said: "I remember writing the big interrogation scene in a dressing room in Leicester."

== Characters ==
- Petey, a man in his sixties
- Meg, a woman in her sixties
- Stanley, a man in his late thirties
- Lulu, a girl in her early twenties
- Goldberg, a man in his fifties
- McCann, a man of thirty

== Summary ==
The Birthday Party is about Stanley Webber, an erstwhile piano player who lives in a rundown boarding house run by Meg and Petey Boles, in an English seaside town, "probably on the south coast, not too far from London". Two sinister strangers, Goldberg and McCann, arrive looking for him, supposedly on his birthday, and turn his apparently innocuous birthday party organised by Meg into a nightmare.

== Plot ==
=== Act 1 ===
While Meg prepares to serve her husband, Petey, breakfast, Stanley, described as a man "in his late thirties", who is dishevelled and unshaven, enters from upstairs. Alternating between maternal and flirtatious affectation toward Stanley, Meg tells him that "two gentlemen", two new "visitors", will be arriving; Stanley appears concerned and suspicious at this information.

At "[a] sudden knock on the front door", Meg goes offstage while Stanley "listens" at a voice coming "through the letter box", but it is just Lulu carrying in a package delivered for Meg. Right after Meg and Lulu exit, Goldberg and McCann arrive, but Stanley immediately "sidles through the kitchen door and out of the back door" to eavesdrop, but they speak only vaguely about "this job" they must do with bureaucratic clichés, nevertheless rendering McCann "satisfied".

After Meg's new "guests" go up to their room, Stanley enters and Meg gives him the package brought by Lulu containing his birthday present. He opens it to reveal a toy drum.

=== Act 2 ===
Stanley encounters McCann and the two talk. McCann is determined to stop Stanley from leaving the house. Stanley's behaviour and speech start to become erratic. He denies the fact that it is his birthday, insists that Meg is mad for saying so, and asks McCann if Goldberg told him why he has been brought to the house. Goldberg enters and sends McCann out to collect some whiskey that he has ordered for the party. When McCann returns, he and Goldberg interrogate Stanley with a series of ambiguous, rhetorical questions, tormenting him to complete collapse. Meg then enters in her party dress, and the party proceeds with a series of toasts in Stanley's honor. Lulu then arrives and engages with Goldberg in romance. The party culminates with a game of blind man's bluff, during which McCann further taunts Stanley by breaking his glasses and trapping his foot in the toy drum. Stanley then attacks Meg and, in the blackout that immediately follows, attacks and attempts to rape Lulu. The act ends with Goldberg and McCann backing the maniacally laughing Stanley against a wall.

=== Act 3 ===
Paralleling the first scene of the play, Petey is having breakfast, and Meg asks him innocuous questions, with important differences revealing the aftermath of the party. After Meg leaves to do some shopping, Petey begins to express concern to Goldberg about Stanley's condition and Goldberg's intention to take him to an unseen character called Monty. There then follows an exchange between Goldberg and McCann during which Goldberg's usual confident style temporarily abandons him, though he seems to recover after asking McCann to blow in his mouth. Lulu then confronts Goldberg about the way he was the previous night (during unseen events that occurred after the party) but is driven from the house by McCann making unsavoury comments about her character and demanding that she confess her sins to him.

McCann then brings in Stanley, with his broken glasses, and he and Goldberg bombard him with a list of his faults and of all the benefits he will obtain by submitting to their influence. When asked for his opinion of what he has to gain, Stanley is unable to answer. They begin to lead him out of the house toward the car waiting to take him to Monty.

Petey confronts them one last time but passively backs down as they take Stanley away, "broken", calling out "Stan, don't let them tell you what to do!" After Meg returns from shopping, she notices that "The car's gone" and as Petey remains silent, he continues to withhold his knowledge of Stanley's departure, allowing her to end the play without knowing the truth about Stanley.

== Genre ==
The Birthday Party has been described (some say "pigeonholed") by Irving Wardle and later critics as a "comedy of menace" and by Martin Esslin as an example of the Theatre of the Absurd. It includes such features as the fluidity and ambiguity of time, place, and identity and the disintegration of language.

== Reception ==
Produced by Michael Codron and David Hall, the play had its world première at the Arts Theatre in Cambridge, England on 28 April 1958, where the play was "warmly received". On its pre-London tour in Oxford and Wolverhampton, it met with a "positive reception" as "the most enthralling experience the Grand Theatre has given us in many months."

On 19 May 1958, the production had its London début at the Lyric Opera House, Hammersmith (now the Lyric Hammersmith). It was a commercial and, mostly, a critical failure, instigating "bewildered hysteria" and closing after only eight performances. The weekend after it had already closed, Harold Hobson's belated rave review, "The Screw Turns Again", appeared in The Sunday Times, rescuing its critical reputation and enabling it to become one of the classics of the modern stage.

From 8 to 24 May 2008, the Lyric celebrated the play's 50th anniversary with a revival, directed by David Farr, as well as related events. They included a gala performance and reception, hosted by Harold Pinter, on 19 May 2008, exactly fifty years after its London première.

== Interpretation ==
Like many of Pinter's other plays, very little of the expository information in The Birthday Party is verifiable; it is contradicted by the characters and otherwise ambiguous, and, therefore, one cannot take what they say at face value. For example, in Act One, Stanley describes his career, saying "I've played the piano all over the world", reduces that immediately to "All over the country", and then, after a pause, undercuts both statements by saying "I once gave a concert."

While the title and the dialogue refer to Meg's planning a party to celebrate Stanley's birthday: "It's your birthday, Stan. I was going to keep it a secret until tonight", even that fact is dubious, as Stanley denies that it is his birthday: "This isn't my birthday, Meg" (48), telling Goldberg and McCann: "Anyway, this isn't my birthday...No, it's not until next month", adding, in response to McCann's saying "Not according to the lady [Meg]", "Her? She's crazy. Round the bend" (53).

Although Meg claims that her house is a boarding house, her husband Petey, who was confronted by two men who "wanted to know if we could put them up for a couple of nights" is surprised that Meg already has prepared a room (23) and Stanley (being the only supposed boarder) also responds to what appears to him to be the sudden appearance of Goldberg and McCann as prospective guests on a supposed short holiday, flat out denies that it is a boarding house: "This is a ridiculous house to pick on...Because it's not a boarding house. It never was." (53)

McCann claims to have no knowledge of Stanley or Maidenhead when Stanley asks him "Ever been anywhere near Maidenhead?...There's a Fuller's teashop. I used to have my tea there...and a Boots Library. I seem to connect you with the High Street...A charming town, don't you think?...A quiet, thriving community. I was born and brought up there. I lived well away from the main road" (51); yet Goldberg later names both businesses that Stanley used to frequent connecting Goldberg and possibly also McCann to Maidenhead: "A little Austin, tea in Fuller's a library book from Boots, and I'm satisfied" (70). Of course, both Stanley and Goldberg could just be inventing these apparent reminiscences as they both appear to have invented other details about their lives earlier, and here Goldberg could conveniently be lifting details from Stanley's earlier own mention of them, which he has heard; as Merritt observes, the factual basis for such apparent correspondences in the dialogue uttered by Pinter's characters remains ambiguous and subject to multiple interpretations.

Shifting identities (cf. "the theme of identity") makes the past ambiguous: Goldberg is called "Nat", but in his stories of the past he says that he was called "Simey" (73) and also "Benny" (92), and he refers to McCann as both "Dermot" (in talking to Petey [87]) and "Seamus" (in talking to McCann [93]). Given such contradictions, these characters' actual names and thus identities remain unclear. According to John Russell Brown (94), "Falsehoods are important for Pinter's dialogue, not least when they can be detected only by careful reference from one scene to another...Some of the more blatant lies are so casually delivered that the audience is encouraged to look for more than is going to be disclosed. This is a part of Pinter's two-pronged tactic of awakening the audience's desire for verification and repeatedly disappointing this desire" (Brown 94).

Although Stanley, just before the lights go out during the birthday party, begins to strangle Meg (78), she has no memory of that the next morning, quite possibly because she had drunk too much (71–74); oblivious to the fact that Goldberg and McCann have removed Stanley from the house – Petey keeps that information from her when she inquires, "Is he still in bed?" by answering "Yes, he's...still asleep"––she ends the play focusing on herself and romanticising her role in the party, "I was the belle of the ball...I know I was" (102). For some, Petey's final reply only makes dramatic sense if the framework of the whole play is in Meg's mind, that her invention of Stan was necessary in an empty marriage, and what the audience has seen was a tragic possibility – no doubt to be followed by another narrative when her Stan arrives.

=== Meg and Petey Boles ===
While on tour with L. du Garde's A Horse! A Horse!, Pinter found himself in Eastbourne without a place to stay. He met a stranger in a pub who said "I can take you to some digs but I wouldn't recommend them exactly", and then led Pinter to the house where he stayed. Pinter told his official biographer Michael Billington,

I went to these digs and found, in short, a very big woman who was the landlady and a little man, the landlord. There was no one else there, apart from a solitary lodger, and the digs were really quite filthy...I slept in the attic with this man I'd met in the pub...we shared the attic and there was a sofa over my bed...propped up so I was looking at this sofa from which hairs and dust fell continuously. And I said to the man, "What are you doing here?" And he said, "Oh well I used to be...I'm a pianist. I used to play in the concert-party here and I gave that up."...The woman was really quite a voracious character, always tousled his head and tickled him and goosed him and wouldn't leave him alone at all. And when I asked him why he stayed, he said, "There's nowhere else to go."

According to Billington, "The lonely lodger, the ravenous landlady, the quiescent husband: these figures, eventually to become Stanley, Meg, and Petey, sound like figures in a Donald McGill seaside postcard" (Harold Pinter 76).

=== Goldberg and McCann ===
Goldberg and McCann "represent not only the West's most autocratic religions, but its two most persecuted races" (Billington, Harold Pinter 80). Goldberg goes by many names, sometimes Nat, but when talking about his past he mentions that he was called by the names "Simey" and also "Benny". He seems to idolise his Uncle Barney as he mentions him many times during the play. Goldberg is portrayed as a Jewish man which is reinforced by his typically Jewish name and his appropriate use of Yiddish words. McCann is an unfrocked priest and has two names. Petey refers to him as Dermot but Goldberg calls him Seamus. The sarcasm in the following exchange evokes some distance in their relationship:

McCANN: You've always been a true Christian
GOLDBERG: In a way.

=== Stanley Webber ===
Stanley Webber — "a palpably Jewish name, incidentally — is a man who shores up his precarious sense of self through fantasy, bluff, violence and his own manipulative form of power-play. His treatment of Meg initially is rough, playful, teasing...but once she makes the fateful, mood-changing revelation —'I've got to get things ready for the two gentlemen'—he's as dangerous as a cornered animal" (Billington, Harold Pinter 78).

=== Lulu ===
Lulu is a working-class woman in her twenties whom Stanley "tries vainly to rape" (Billington, Harold Pinter 112) during the titular birthday party at the end of Act II. A conversation between Lulu and Goldberg the following morning reveals that the two slept together the previous night.

== Themes ==
According to Pinter's official biographer, Michael Billington, in Harold Pinter, echoing Pinter's own retrospective view of it, The Birthday Party is "a deeply political play about the individual's imperative need for resistance," yet, according to Billington, though he "doubts whether this was conscious on Pinter's part", it is also "a private, obsessive work about time past; about some vanished world, either real or idealised, into which all but one of the characters readily escapes..From the very outset, the defining quality of a Pinter play is not so much fear and menace –– though they are undoubtedly present –– as a yearning for some lost Eden as a refuge from the uncertain, miasmic present" (82).

As quoted by Arnold P. Hinchliffe, Polish critic Grzegorz Sinko points out that in The Birthday Party "we see the destruction of the victim from the victim's own point of view:

"One feels like saying that the two executioners, Goldberg and McCann, stand for all the principles of the state and social conformism. Goldberg refers to his 'job' in a typically Kafka-esque official language which deprives the crimes of all sense and reality"...[Of Stanley's removal, Sinko adds:] "Maybe Stanley will meet his death there or maybe he will only receive a conformist brainwashing after which he is promised...many other gifts of civilization..."

In an interview with Mel Gussow, which is about the 1988 Classic Stage Company production of The Birthday Party, later paired with Mountain Language in a 1989 CSC production, in both of which David Strathairn played Stanley, Gussow asked Pinter: "The Birthday Party has the same story as One for the Road?"

In the original interview first published in The New York Times on 30 December 1988, Gussow quotes Pinter as stating: "The character of the old man, Petey, says one of the most important lines I've ever written. As Stanley is taken away, Petey says, 'Stan, don't let them tell you what to do.' I've lived that line all my damn life. Never more than now."

In responding to Gussow's question, Pinter refers to all three plays when he replies: "It's the destruction of an individual, the independent voice of an individual. I believe that is precisely what the United States is doing to Nicaragua. It's a horrifying act. If you see child abuse, you recognize it and you're horrified. If you do it yourself, you apparently don't know what you're doing."

As Bob Bows observes in his review of the 2008 Germinal Stage Denver production, whereas at first " 'The Birthday Party' appears to be a straightforward story of a former working pianist now holed up in a decrepit boarding house", in this play as in his other plays, "behind the surface symbolism...in the silence between the characters and their words, Pinter opens the door to another world, cogent and familiar: the part we hide from ourselves"; ultimately, "Whether we take Goldberg and McCann to be the devil and his agent or simply their earthly emissaries, the puppeteers of the church-state apparatus, or some variation thereof, Pinter's metaphor of a bizarre party bookended by birth and death is a compelling take on this blink-of-an-eye we call life."

== Selected production history ==
=== London première ===
Lyric Hammersmith, London, UK, directed by Peter Wood, May 1958.

Cast

- Willoughby Gray as Petey
- Beatrix Lehmann as Meg
- Richard Pearson as Stanley
- Wendy Hutchinson as Lulu
- John Slater as Goldberg
- John Stratton as McCann

(The Birthday Party [Grove Press ed.] 8)

=== Edinburgh ===
Edinburgh Gateway Company, directed by Victor Carin, 1962

=== New York City première ===
Booth Theatre, New York, US, directed by Alan Schneider, October 1967.

Cast

- Henderson Forsythe as Petey
- Ruth White as Meg
- James Patterson as Stanley
- Alexandra Berlin as Lulu
- Ed Flanders as Goldberg
- Edward Winter as McCann

(The Birthday Party [Grove Press ed.] 8) The production was profiled in the William Goldman book The Season: A Candid Look at Broadway.

==== 2013 ====
Steppenwolf Theatre Company, Chicago directed by Austin Pendleton 24 January – 28 April 2013. The cast included Ian Barford as Stanley, John Mahoney as Petey, and Moira Harris as Meg.

==== 2018 ====
The play was revived by Ian Rickson at the Harold Pinter Theatre, London starring Toby Jones (who reprised the role of Stanley after his 2016 performance for BBC Radio 3), Stephen Mangan, Zoe Wanamaker and Pearl Mackie, 9 January – 14 April 2018.

==== 2024 ====
The play was revived at the Ustinov Studio, in Bath, directed by Richard Jones from 2 to 31 August 2024, starring Jane Horrocks, Caolan Byrne, Carla Harrison-Hodge, Sam Swainsbury and Nicolas Tennant.

== See also ==
- The Birthday Party (1968 film adaptation directed by William Friedkin)
- Comedy of menace
- Theatre of the absurd

== Selected bibliography ==
Articles and reviews

- Andrews, Jamie. "L'anniversaire". (The Birthday Party). Harold Pinter Archive Blog, British Library (BL), 3 March 2009. (Performance rev. of a French revival staged after Pinter's death written by the BL Curator of Modern Literary Manuscripts, who is the custodian of Pinter's Archive.)
- Lee, Veronica. "Sheila Hancock: Harold Pinter Wasn't Like Us – He Never Went to the Pub". The Daily Telegraph, 5 May 2005. 7 May 2008. (Leader: "As she prepares to star in the 50th anniversary production of 'The Birthday Party', Sheila Hancock recalls the shock of seeing it for the first time and what its author was like as a young actor called Dave [David Baron]...")

Books

- Billington, Michael. Harold Pinter. Rev. and exp. ed. of The Life and Work of Harold Pinter. 1996; London: Faber and Faber, 2007. ISBN 0-571-19065-0 (1996 ed.). ISBN 978-0-571-23476-9 (13) (2007 paperback ed.).
- Gussow, Mel. Conversations with Harold Pinter. London: Nick Hern Books, 1994. ISBN 1-85459-201-7. New York: Limelight, 1994. ISBN 0-87910-179-2 (10). ISBN 978-0-87910-179-4 (13). New York: Grove P, 1996. ISBN 0-8021-3467-X (10). ISBN 978-0-8021-3467-7 (13).
- Harold Pinter: The Birthday Party, The Caretaker, The Homecoming: A Casebook. Ed. Michael Scott. Casebook Ser. General Ed. A.E. Dyson New York: Macmillan, 1986. ISBN 0-333-35269-6 (10).
- Hinchliffe, Arnold P. Harold Pinter. The Griffin Authors Ser. New York: St. Martin's P, 1967. LCCCN 74-80242. Twayne's English Authors Ser. New York: Twayne Publishers, 1967. LCCCN 67-12264. Rev. ed. 1967; New York: Twayne Publishers, 1981. ISBN 0-8057-6784-3 (10). ISBN 978-0-8057-6784-1 (13).
- Merritt, Susan Hollis. Pinter in Play: Critical Strategies and the Plays of Harold Pinter. 1990; Durham and London: Duke UP, 1995. ISBN 0-8223-1674-9 (10). ISBN 978-0-8223-1674-9 (13).
- Naismith, Bill. Harold Pinter. Faber Critical Guides. London: Faber and Faber, 2000. ISBN 0-571-19781-7 (10). ISBN 978-0-571-19781-1 (13).
- Pinter, Harold. The Birthday Party. 15–102 in The Essential Pinter. New York: Grove P, 2006. ISBN 0-8021-4269-9 (10). ISBN 978-0-8021-4269-6 (13).
- Pinter, Harold. 'The Birthday Party', in Pinter: Plays One. (London: Eyre Methuen, 1986). ISBN 0-413-34650-1
- –––. Various Voices: Prose, Poetry, Politics 1948–2005. Rev. ed. 1998; London: Faber and Faber, 2005. ISBN 0-571-23009-1 (10). ISBN 978-0-571-23009-9 (13). (Includes "Letter to Peter Wood ... (1958)" in "On The Birthday Party I" 11–15; "Letter to the Editor of The Play's the Thing, October 1958" in "On The Birthday Party II" 16–19 and "A View of the Party" (1958) 149–50.)

Audio-visual resources

- Jones, Rebecca, and Harold Pinter. Interview. Today. BBC Radio 4 BBC, 12 May 2008. World Wide Web. 7 April 2009. (Streaming audio [excerpts], BBC Radio Player; "extended interview" audio RealAudio Media [.ram] clip ["PINTER20080513"]. Duration of shorter, broadcast version: 3 mins., 56 secs.; duration of the extended interview: 10 mins., 19 secs. Interview with Pinter conducted by Jones on the occasion of the 50th anniversary revival at the Lyric Hammersmith, London; BBC Radio Player version was accessible for a week after first broadcast in "Listen again" on the Today website.)
