= Charles Marowitz =

American dramatist

Charles Marowitz (26 January 1934 – 2 May 2014) was an American critic, theatre director, and playwright, regular columnist on Swans Commentary. He collaborated with Peter Brook at the Royal Shakespeare Company, and later founded and directed The Open Space Theatre in London.

He was also the co-founder of Encore magazine which was published between 1954 and 1965, and co-editor of The Encore Reader: A Chronicle of the New Drama (1965). He was a regular contributor to publications such as The New York Times, The Times (London), TheaterWeek, and American Theatre and was the lead critic on the Los Angeles Herald-Examiner until it ceased publication.

The period as a critic in London was recorded in the book Confessions of a Counterfeit Critic (Eyre Methuen 1973). Its subtitle was A London Theatre Notebook 1958–1971.

He was the author of Murdering Marlowe, which imagined a rivalry between William Shakespeare and Christopher Marlowe. It was selected as a finalist for the GLAAD Media Awards of 2002. He was author the 1987 Broadway play Sherlock's Last Case with Frank Langella in the lead role.

His free adaptations of Shakespeare were collected in The Marowitz Shakespeare. He died of complications from Parkinson's disease in 2014 at the age of 80.

== Selected bibliography ==
- Marowitz, Charles (1977). Artaud at Rodez. London: Marion Boyars. ISBN 0-7145-2632-0.
- Marowitz, Charles, ed. and trans. (2000). The Marowitz Shakespeare: Adaptions and Collages of Hamlet, MacBeth, the Taming of the Shrew, Measure for Measure, and the Merchant of Venice. London: Marion Boyars. ISBN 978-0-7145-2651-5.
- –––, Tom Milne, and Owen Hale, eds. (1981). The Encore Reader: A Chronicle of the New Drama. London: Methuen, 1965. Reissued as New Theatre Voices of the Fifties and Sixties. London: Eyre Methuen.
- Trussler, Simon (2014). Charles Marowitz in London: Twenty-Five Years Hard: Marowitz in the Sixties. New Theatre Quarterly, 30:3, p. 203–206
