= List of works by Harold Pinter =

Works of Harold Pinter provides a list of Harold Pinter's stage and television plays; awards and nominations for plays; radio plays; screenplays for films; awards and nominations for screenwriting; dramatic sketches; prose fiction; collected poetry; and awards for poetry. It augments a section of the main article on this author.

== Stage and television plays ==
- The Room (written 1957; first performance 15 May 1957)
- The Birthday Party (written 1957; first performance 28 April 1958)
- The Dumb Waiter (written 1957; first performance 21 January 1960)
- A Slight Ache (written 1958; first performance 29 July 1959)
- The Hothouse (written 1958; first performance 24 April 1980)
- A Night Out (written 1959; first performance 1 March 1960)
- The Caretaker (written 1959; first performance 27 April 1960)
- Night School (written 1960; first performance 21 July 1960)
- The Dwarfs (written 1960; first performance 2 December 1960)
- The Collection (written 1961; first performance 11 May 1961)
- The Lover (written 1962; first performance 28 March 1963)
- Tea Party (written 1964; first performance 25 March 1965)
- The Homecoming (written 1964; first performance 3 June 1965)
- The Basement (written 1966; first performance 28 February 1967)
- Landscape (written 1967; first performance 25 April 1968)
- Silence (written 1968; first performance 2 July 1969)
- Night (written 1969; first performance 9 April 1969)
- Old Times (written 1970; first performance 1 June 1971)
- Monologue (written 1972; first performance 10 April 1973)
- No Man's Land (written 1974; first performance 23 April 1975)
- Betrayal (written 1978; first performance 15 November 1978)
- Family Voices (written 1980; first performance 22 January 1981)
- Victoria Station (written 1982; performed with Family Voices in 1982 as part of Other Places)
- A Kind of Alaska (written 1982; performed with Family Voices in 1982 as part of Other Places)
- One for the Road (written 1984; first performance 13 March 1984)
- Mountain Language (written 1988; first performance 20 October 1988)
- The New World Order (written 1991; first performance 19 July 1991)
- Party Time (written 1991; first performance 31 October 1991)
- Moonlight (written 1993; first performance 7 September 1993)
- Ashes to Ashes (written 1996; first performance 12 September 1996)
- Celebration (written 1999; first performance 16 March 2000)
- Remembrance of Things Past (written 2000; first performance 23 November 2000) — stage adaptation of The Proust Screenplay; a collaboration with Di Trevis

=== Awards and nominations for plays ===
Broadway

- 1962 Tony Award Best Play: The Caretaker (nominee)
- 1967 Tony Award Best Play: The Homecoming (winner)
- 1972 Tony Award Best Play: Old Times (nominee)
- 1977 Drama Desk Award Outstanding New Play (Foreign): No Man's Land (nominee)

== Dramatic sketches ==
- The Black and White (1959)
- Trouble in the Works (1959)
- The Last to Go (1959)
- Request Stop (1959)
- Special Offer (1959)
- That's Your Trouble (1959)
- That's All (1959)
- Interview (1959)
- Applicant (1959)
- Dialogue for Three (1959)
- Umbrellas (1960)
- Mac (1968)
- Precisely (1983)
- "God's District" (1997) — monologue written for the revue Then Again...
- Press Conference (2002)
- Apart From That (2006)

== Radio plays ==
- Voices (2005) — collaboration with composer James Clarke

== Screenplays for films ==
- The Caretaker (1963)
- The Servant (1963)
- The Pumpkin Eater (1964)
- "The Compartment" (1965) — unpublished screenplay for unproduced film; adapted for stage as The Basement (1966)
- The Quiller Memorandum (1965)
- Accident (1966)
- The Birthday Party (1968) — unpublished screenplay adapted by Pinter from his play The Birthday Party (1957)
- The Go-Between (1970)
- The Homecoming (1969)
- Langrishe, Go Down (1970; adapted for TV 1978; film release 2002)
- The Proust Screenplay (1972) — published 1978, but unproduced for film; adapted by Harold Pinter and director Di Trevis for the stage (2000); cf. Remembrance of Things Past
- The Last Tycoon (1974)
- The French Lieutenant's Woman (1981)
- Betrayal (1982, 1983)
- Victory (1982) — published but unproduced
- Turtle Diary (1984)
- "The Handmaid's Tale" (1987) — unpublished credited screenplay commissioned for the 1990 film The Handmaid's Tale
- Reunion (1989)
- The Heat of the Day (1988) — adapted for TV
- The Comfort of Strangers (1989)
- "The Remains of the Day" (1991) — unpublished and uncredited (at Pinter's request) screenplay commissioned for the 1993 film The Remains of the Day
- Party Time (1992) — revised and adapted for TV
- The Trial (1993)
- "Lolita" (1994) — unpublished and uncredited screenplay commissioned for the 1997 film Lolita
- The Dreaming Child (1997) — published but unproduced; adapted from a short story by Isak Dinesen
- "The Tragedy of King Lear" (2000) — unpublished screenplay commissioned by actor Tim Roth for a film to be directed by Roth, but not produced
- Sleuth (2007)

=== Awards and nominations for screenwriting ===
- 1963 BAFTA Best British Screenplay: The Servant (nominee)
- 1964 BAFTA Best British Screenplay: The Pumpkin Eater (winner)
- 1966 BAFTA Best British Screenplay: The Quiller Memorandum (nominee)
- 1967 BAFTA Best British Screenplay: Accident (nominee)
- 1972 Society of Film and Television Arts Best Screenplay: The Go-Between (winner)
- 1972 BAFTA Best Screenplay: The Go-Between (winner)
- 1976 David di Donatello (Italian Academy Awards) Best Foreign Screenplay: The Last Tycoon (winner)
- 1976 Ennio Flaiano Award for Screenwriting: The Last Tycoon (winner)
- 1981 BAFTA Best Screenplay: The French Lieutenant's Woman (nominee)
- 1981 Academy Award for Best Screenplay Based on Material from Another Medium: The French Lieutenant's Woman (nominee)
- 1982 David di Donatello (Italian Academy Awards) Best Foreign Screenplay: The French Lieutenant's Woman (winner)
- 1982 Golden Globe Award for Best Screenplay––Motion Picture: The French Lieutenant's Woman (nominee)
- 1983 Academy Award for Best Screenplay Based on Material From Another Medium: Betrayal (nominee)
- 1983 BAFTA Best Adapted Screenplay: Betrayal (nominee)

== Prose fiction ==
- "Kullus" (1949)
- The Dwarfs (written from 1952 to 1956; rev. and first published 1990) (Novel)
- "Latest Reports from the Stock Exchange" (1953)
- "The Black and White" (1954–55)
- "The Examination" (1955)
- "Tea Party" (1963)
- "The Coast" (1975)
- "Problem" (1976)
- "Lola" (1977)
- "Short Story" (1995)
- "Girls" (1995)
- "Sorry About This" (1999)
- "Tess" (2000)
- "Voices in the Tunnel" (2001)
- "The Mirror" (2007)

== Collected poetry ==
- Poems (1971)
- I Know the Place (1977)
- Poems and Prose 1949–1977 (1978)
- Ten Early Poems (1990)
- Collected Poems and Prose (1995)
- "The Disappeared" and Other Poems (2002)
- Poems by Harold Pinter Chosen by Antonia Fraser. Warwick: Greville Press Pamphlets, 2002. (Limited ed. of 300 copies, "of which the first fifty are numbered and signed by the selector.")
- Six Poems for A. Warwick: Greville Press Pamphlets, 2007. ISBN 0-9555821-1-3 (10). ISBN 978-0-9555821-1-0 (13).

== Anthologies and other collections ==
- 99 Poems in Translation: An Anthology Selected by Harold Pinter, Anthony Astbury, & Geoffrey Godbert (1994)
- 100 Poems by 100 Poets: An Anthology Selected by Harold Pinter, Anthony Astbury, & Geoffrey Godbert (1987; rpt. 1992)
- 101 Poems Against War (2003). Eds. Matthew Hollis & Paul Kegan. Afterword Andrew Motion. (Incl. "American Football", by Harold Pinter [80].)
- War (2003)
- Various Voices: Prose, Poetry, Politics 1948–2005 (1998; rev. & updated, 2005)
- Death etc. (2005)
- The Essential Pinter (2006)
- Various Voices: Sixty Years of Prose, Poetry, Politics 1948–2008 (1998 & 2005; rev. & updated, 2009)

=== Awards for poetry ===
- 2004 Wilfred Owen Award for Poetry

== Speeches ==
- "Art, Truth and Politics" (2005) ["Nobel Lecture" delivered live via video on 7 Dec. 2005]

== See also ==
- Characteristics of Harold Pinter's work

== Works cited ==
Baker, William, and John C. Ross, comps. Harold Pinter: A Bibliographical History. London: The British Library and New Castle, DE: Oak Knoll P, 2005. ISBN 1-58456-156-4 (10). ISBN 978-1-58456-156-9 (13). Print. "Oak Knoll Press Bestsellers", "Oak Knoll Summer 2007 Catalogue]" (PDF). Archived from the original (PDF) on 28 February 2008. (9.25 MB). Oak Knoll Press, 2007. Web. 2 Oct. 2007. (Page 37 of 40 pages.)

"Biobibliographical Notes" and "Bibliography" for "Harold Pinter, Nobel Prize in Literature 2005." In "Bio-bibliography". By The Swedish Academy. The Nobel Prize in Literature 2005. nobelprize.org. The Swedish Academy and The Nobel Foundation, Oct. 2005. Web. 6 Jan. 2009. (English HTML version.) [Additional PDF versions accessible in English, French, German, and Swedish via hyperlinks.]

Harold Pinter: An Inventory of His Collection at the Harry Ransom Humanities Research Center (1960–1980). Harry Ransom Humanities Research Center, University of Texas at Austin, 1999. Web. 5 Apr. 2009.

"Links: Libraries and Academia" and "Publications": "Works By" and "Works About" Pinter. haroldpinter.org. Harold Pinter, 2000–[2009]. Web. 18 Apr. 2009.

Merritt, Susan Hollis, comp. "Harold Pinter Bibliography". SusanHollisMerritt.org. Susan Hollis Merritt, 2009. Web. 18 Apr. 2009. (Webpage pertaining to the "Harold Pinter Bibliography" published in The Pinter Review. Tampa: U of Tampa P, 1987– .)

–––. "Harold Pinter Bibliography: 2000–2002." The Pinter Review: Collected Essays 2003 and 2004. Ed. Francis Gillen and Steven H. Gale. Tampa: U of Tampa P, 2004. 242–300. Print.

–––. "Harold Pinter Bibliography: 2002–2004 With a Special Supplement on the 2005 Nobel Prize in Literature, October 2005 – May 2006." The Pinter Review: Nobel Prize/Europe Theatre Prize Volume: 2005–2008. Ed. Francis Gillen with Steven H. Gale. Tampa: U of Tampa P, 2008. 261–343. Print.

The Pinter Review. Tampa: U of Tampa P, (1987– ). Ed. Francis Gillen and Steven H. Gale. HaroldPinter.org. Harold Pinter, 2000–[2008]. Web. 3 Jan. 2009. [Table of contents of past issues, retyped on index Webpage; occasional typographical variations.]

The Pinter Review: Nobel Prize/Europe Theatre Prize Volume: 2005–2008. Ed. Francis Gillen with Steven H. Gale. Tampa: U of Tampa P, 2008. ISBN 978-1-879852-19-8 (hardcover). ISBN 978-1-879852-20-4 (softcover). ISSN 0895-9706. Print.
