= Harold Pinter Theatre =

West End theatre in London

- Comedy Theatre; Royal Comedy Theatre
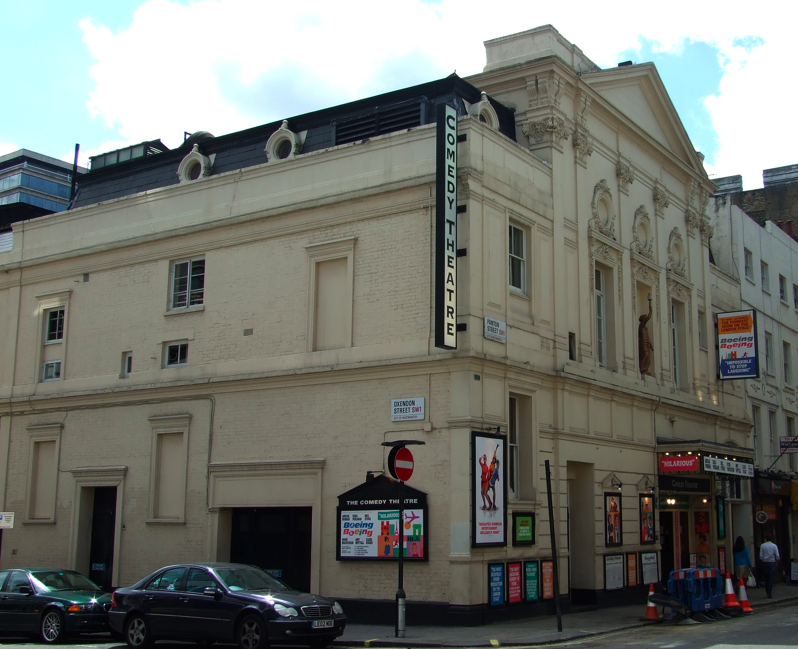
- The theatre in 2007
- Interactive map of Harold Pinter Theatre
- Address: Panton Street; London, SW1; United Kingdom
- Coordinates: 51°30′34″N 0°7′54″W
- Owner: ATG Entertainment
- Capacity: 796 (1,186 originally)
- Type: West End theatre
- Designation: Grade II
- Production: The Cherry Orchard
- Public transit: Piccadilly Circus

Construction
- Opened: 15 October 1881; 145 years ago
- Architect: Thomas Verity

Website
- www.haroldpintertheatre.co.uk

The Harold Pinter Theatre, known as the Comedy Theatre until 2011, is a West End theatre, and opened on Panton Street in the City of Westminster, on 15 October 1881, as the Royal Comedy Theatre. It was designed by Thomas Verity and built in just six months in painted (stucco) stone and brick. By 1884 it was known as simply the Comedy Theatre. In the mid-1950s the theatre underwent major reconstruction and re-opened in December 1955; the auditorium remains essentially that of 1881, with three tiers of horseshoe-shaped balconies.

== History ==
=== Early years: 1881–1900 ===
The streets between Leicester Square and the Haymarket had been of insalubrious reputation until shortly before the construction of the Comedy Theatre, but by 1881 the "doubtful resorts of the roisterers" had been removed. J. H. Addison held a plot of ground in Panton Street at the corner of Oxenden Street, for which he commissioned the architect Thomas Verity to design a theatre. The builders were Kirk and Randall of Woolwich. The original seating capacity was 1,186, comprising 140 stalls, 120 dress circle, 126 upper boxes, amphitheatre 100, pit 400 and gallery 300. the construction was completed in six months.

The theatre was, and remains, a four-tier house, its exterior in the classical tradition in painted (stucco) stone and brick. The theatrical newspaper The Era described the interior as "Renaissance style, richly moulded and finished in white and gold. The draperies of the boxes are of maroon plush, elegantly draped and embroidered in gold". It was originally planned to light the theatre by the new electric lighting, but for unspecified reasons this was temporarily abandoned, and the usual gas lighting was installed. (Note: The delay did not affect the Comedy's chance of being the first theatre in London (or anywhere else) to be lit by electricity, as that distinction had already been won by the Savoy, which opened five days before the Comedy.)

The first lessee of the theatre, Alexander Henderson, who had worked with Verity on the design of the building, intended it to be the home of comic opera; at one time he had intended to call it the Lyric. (Note: The London theatre of that name was not built until 1888.) The theatre historians Mander and Mitchenson write that the name he finally chose – the Royal Comedy – lacked any official approval for the use of "Royal", which was dropped within three years. (Note: There was a royal connexion of sorts: the Prince of Wales was in the audience on the opening night.) He assembled a strong team, including Lionel Brough as stage director and Auguste van Biene as musical director.

Fred Leslie as Rip Van Winkle, 1882

The theatre opened on 15 October 1881 with Edmond Audran's opéra comique La mascotte in an English adaptation by Robert Reece and H. B. Farnie. La mascotte was followed by three more adaptations by Farnie: Suppé's Boccaccio, Planquette's Rip Van Winkle (with Fred Leslie as Rip) in 1882, and Chassaigne's Falka (with Violet Cameron in the title role) in 1884. The last of the series of operettas was Erminie in 1885, which starred, among others, Violet Melnotte, who became the lessee of the theatre in that year. She presented plays including The Silver Shield by Sydney Grundy; and Sister Mary by Wilson Barrett and Clement Scott (1886), and a season of comic operas in which she appeared herself.

Melnotte sub-let the theatre in 1887 to Herbert Beerbohm Tree – his first venture into management – who presented and co-starred with Marion Terry in The Red Lamp by Outram Tristram. The following year the sub-lessee was Charles Hawtrey, who ran the theatre until 1892 and produced Jane (1890) and many farces described by Mander and Mitchenson as "now-forgotten".

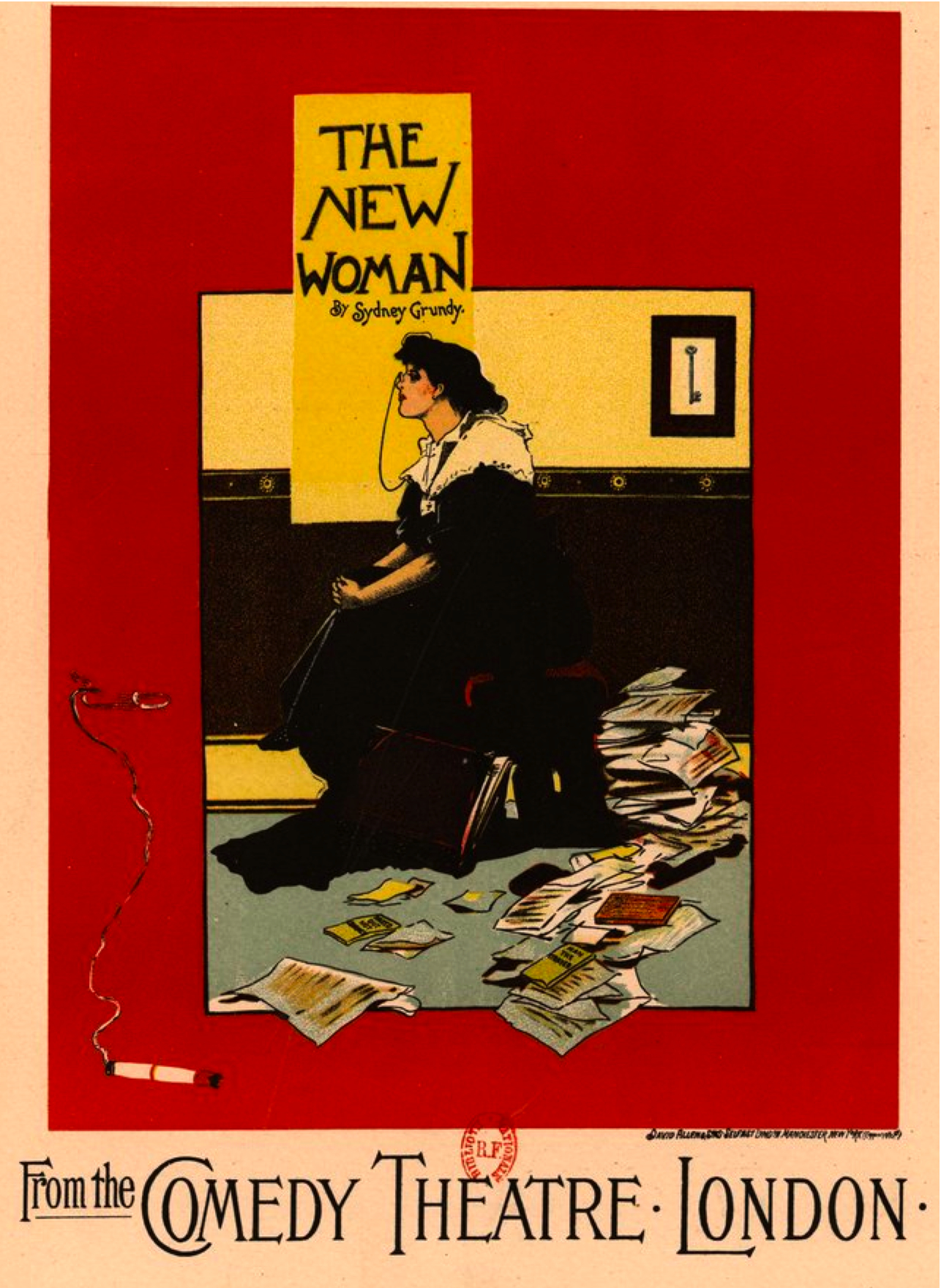
Poster for The New Woman

In 1893 J. Comyns Carr took over the management of the theatre. He remained in charge for three years, producing among other plays Sowing the Wind by Sydney Grundy (1893); The Professor's Love Story by J. M. Barrie (1894); The New Woman by Grundy (1894); and The Benefit of the Doubt by A. W. Pinero (1895). The resident stars of the house in this period were Cyril Maude and his wife Winifred Emery. Hawtrey resumed the management in a play of his own, Mr Martin, in which he co-starred with Lottie Venne. which he followed with a successful season of light comedies. William Greet took over the theatre in 1898 and presented Arthur Roberts and Ada Reeve in a musical comedy Milord Sir Smith with music by Edward Jakobowski. The major productions of 1899 were A Lady of Quality by Frances Hodgson Burnett, and Great Caesar by George Grossmith Jr. and Paul Rubens, with Willie Edouin, Grossmith and Reeve.

=== 20th century ===
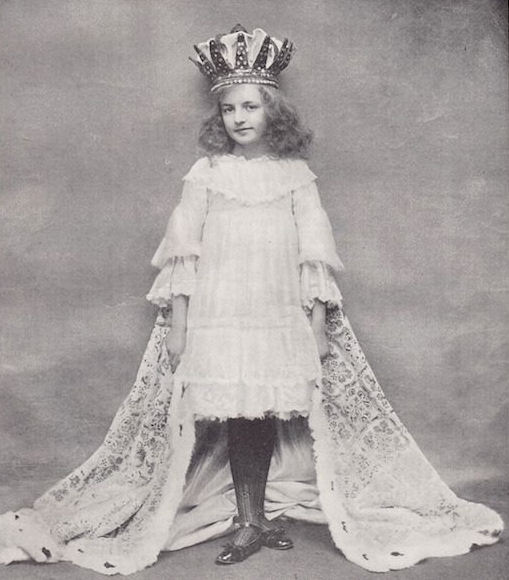
Maidie Andrews as Alice in Alice Through the Looking-Glass at the Comedy Theatre during the Christmas period 1903–04. Pictured in The Tatler (January 1904)

In the early years of the 20th century the Comedy was often used for special seasons and matinée performances of avant garde plays. Frank Benson and his company, which included Lilian Braithwaite and Oscar Asche, played a Shakespeare season in 1901. In 1902, Lewis Waller presented an adaption of Monsieur Beaucaire which ran for 430 performances.

In 1904 Fred Terry and Julia Neilson played in Sunday for a run of 129 performances. The following year Charles Frohman presented John Barrymore in his first London appearance in The Dictator. In 1906 John Hare presented a short season, appearing in The Alabaster Staircase, and a revival of A Pair of Spectacles. Other productions in the first decade of the century included Raffles with Gerald du Maurier in the title role (1906), which ran for 351 performances; 1907, a series of six dramas by Somerset Maugham and others starring Marie Tempest (1907–1909); and Marie Löhr in Pinero's Preserving Mr Panmure (1911). The final production to open before the First World War was Peg o' My Heart, with Laurette Taylor, which ran for 710 performances.

In 1915 the Comedy followed the fashion for revue, presenting Albert de Courville's Shell Out! (1915), C. B. Cochran's Half-past Eight (1916), and four successive revues by André Charlot: This and That and See-Saw! (1916), and Bubbly and Tails Up (1918). They all ran well, particularly the last two, which ran for 429 and 467 performances respectively.

The theatre established the New Watergate Club in 1956, under producer Anthony Field, to counter the stage censorship in force at the time. The Theatres Act 1843 was still in force and required scripts to be submitted for approval by the Lord Chamberlain's Office. Formation of the club allowed plays that had been banned due to language or subject matter to be performed under "club" conditions.

Plays produced in this way included the UK premières of Arthur Miller's A View from the Bridge, Robert Anderson's Tea and Sympathy and Tennessee Williams' Cat on a Hot Tin Roof. The law was not revoked until 1968, but in the late 1950s there was a loosening of conditions in theatre censorship, the club was dissolved and Peter Shaffer's Five Finger Exercise premièred to a public audience.

The theatre was Grade II listed by English Heritage in June 1972.

In 2011, it was renamed the Harold Pinter Theatre, after the playwright Harold Pinter.

== Recent productions ==
- Steptoe and Son in Murder at Oil Drum Lane (22 February – 15 April 2006) by Ray Galton and John Antrobus
- Donkeys' Years (9 May – 15 December 2006) by Michael Frayn, starring Samantha Bond, David Haig, Mark Addy and James Dreyfus
- The Rocky Horror Show (4–29 January 2007) by Richard O'Brien, starring David Bedella and Suzanne Shaw
- Boeing-Boeing (15 February 2007 – 5 January 2008) by Marc Camoletti, starring Roger Allam, Frances de la Tour, Elena Roger, Mark Rylance, Daisy Beaumont, Tamzin Outhwaite, Amy Nuttall, Rhea Perlman, Jean Marsh, Jennifer Ellison, Tracy-Ann Oberman and Kevin McNally
- The Lover/The Collection (29 January – 3 May 2008) by Harold Pinter, starring Timothy West, Gina McKee, Charlie Cox and Richard Coyle
- Dickens Unplugged (9–29 June 2008) by Adam Long
- Sunset Boulevard (15 December 2008 – 30 May 2009) by Andrew Lloyd Webber, directed by Craig Revel Horwood
- Too Close to the Sun (24 July – 8 August 2009), world premiere of a new musical about Ernest Hemingway
- Prick Up Your Ears (30 September – 6 December 2009) by Simon Bent, starring Matt Lucas and Chris New
- The Misanthrope (17 December 2009 – 13 March 2010) by Molière, starring Keira Knightley, Damian Lewis, Tara Fitzgerald and Dominic Rowan
- Mrs. Warren's Profession (25 March – 19 June 2010) by George Bernard Shaw, starring Felicity Kendal
- La Bête (7 July – 4 September 2010) by David Hirson, starring Mark Rylance, David Hyde Pierce and Joanna Lumley
- Birdsong (28 September 2010 – 15 January 2011) based on the book by Sebastian Faulks, starring Ben Barnes
- The Children's Hour (9 February – 7 May 2011) by Lillian Hellman, starring Keira Knightley
- Betrayal (16 June – 20 August 2011) by Harold Pinter, starring Kristin Scott Thomas, Douglas Henshall and Ben Miles
- Death and the Maiden (24 October 2011 – 21 January 2012) by Ariel Dorfman starring Thandie Newton, Tom Goodman-Hill and Anthony Calf
- Absent Friends (9 February – 14 April 2012) by Alan Ayckbourn, starring Reece Shearsmith, Kara Tointon and Elizabeth Berrington
- South Downs and The Browning Version (24 April – 21 July 2012) by Terence Rattigan, starring Nicholas Farrell, Anna Chancellor and Alex Lawther
- A Chorus of Disapproval (27 September 2012 – 5 January 2013) by Alan Ayckbourn, starring Rob Brydon, Nigel Harman and Ashley Jensen
- Old Times (31 January – 6 April 2013) by Harold Pinter, starring Rufus Sewell, Kristin Scott Thomas and Lia Williams
- Merrily We Roll Along (23 April – 27 July 2013) by Stephen Sondheim and George Furth transferred from Menier Chocolate Factory.
- Chimerica (7 August – 19 October 2013) by Lucy Kirkwood, starring Claudie Blakley and Stephen Campbell Moore
- Mojo (13 November 2013 – 8 February 2014) by Jez Butterworth, starring Brendan Coyle, Rupert Grint and Ben Whishaw
- Relative Values (14 April – 21 June 2014) by Noël Coward, starring Patricia Hodge, Caroline Quentin and Rory Bremner
- The Importance of Being Earnest (17 July – 20 September 2014) by Oscar Wilde, starring Siân Phillips, Nigel Havers and Martin Jarvis
- Sunny Afternoon (28 October 2014 – 29 October 2016)
- Nice Fish (25 November 2016 – 11 February 2017) by Mark Rylance and Louis Jenkins, starring Mark Rylance
- Who's Afraid of Virginia Woolf? (9 March – 27 May 2017) by Edward Albee, starring Imelda Staunton and Conleth Hill
- Hamlet (15 June – 2 September 2017) by William Shakespeare, starring Andrew Scott
- Oslo (11 October – 30 December 2017) by J. T. Rogers, starring Toby Stephens and Lydia Leonard
- The Birthday Party (18 January – 14 April 2018) by Harold Pinter, starring Toby Jones, Stephen Mangan and Zoë Wanamaker
- Consent (29 May – 11 August 2018) by Nina Raine, starring Adam James, Stephen Campbell Moore and Claudie Blakley
- Ian McKellen On Stage: Shakespeare, Tolkien, Others and You (20 September 2019 – 5 January 2020) starring Ian McKellen
- Uncle Vanya (23 January – 2 May 2020) by Anton Chekhov, adapted by Conor McPherson, starring Toby Jones and Richard Armitage (closed early due to the COVID-19 pandemic)
- The Watsons (19 May – 26 September 2020) (cancelled due to the COVID-19 pandemic)
- Blithe Spirit (16 September – 6 November 2021) by Noël Coward, starring Jennifer Saunders (production was previously playing at the Duke of York's Theatre when theatres closed due to COVID-19 pandemic)
- Four Quartets (18 November – 18 December 2021) by T. S. Eliot, starring Ralph Fiennes
- David Suchet - Poirot and More, A Retrospective (4–22 January 2022) starring David Suchet
- The Human Voice (17 March – 9 April 2022), by Jean Cocteau, starring Ruth Wilson
- Prima Facie (15 April – 18 June 2022) by Suzie Miller, starring Jodie Comer
- Good (5 October 2022 – 7 January 2023) by C. P. Taylor, starring David Tennant
- Lemons Lemons Lemons Lemons Lemons (18 January – 18 March 2023) by Sam Steiner, starring Jenna Coleman and Aidan Turner
- A Little Life (25 March – 18 June 2023) based on the novel by Hanya Yanagihara, starring James Norton, Luke Thompson and Omari Douglas
- Dr. Semmelweis (29 June – 7 October 2023) starring Mark Rylance
- Lyonesse (17 October – 23 December 2023) by Penelope Skinner, starring Kristin Scott Thomas and Lily James
- The Hills of California (27 January – 15 June 2024) by Jez Butterworth, starring Laura Donnelly
- Your Lie In April (5 July – 11 August 2024) by Frank Wildhorn, Tracy Miller, Carly Robyn Green and Rinne B. Groff
- Macbeth (1 October – 14 December 2024) by William Shakespeare, starring David Tennant and Cush Jumbo
- The Years (24 January – 19 April 2025) by Annie Ernaux, adapted by Eline Arbo
- Giant (26 April – 2 August 2025) by Mark Rosenblatt, starring John Lithgow
- A Man for All Seasons (6 August – 6 September 2025) by Robert Bolt, starring Martin Shaw
- The Weir (11 September – 6 December 2025) by Conor McPherson, starring Brendan Gleeson
- High Noon (17 December 2025 – 6 March 2026) by Eric Roth, starring Billy Crudup and Denise Gough
- Romeo & Juliet (16 March – 6 June 2026) by William Shakespeare, starring Sadie Sink and Noah Jupe
- Allegra (8 July – 8 August 2026) by Peter Quilter, starring Maureen Lipman
- Abigail's Party (12 August – 19 September 2026) by Mike Leigh, starring Tamzin Outhwaite and Kevin Bishop
- The Cherry Orchard (3 October 2026 – 9 January 2027) by Anton Chekhov, in a new version by Conor McPherson, starring Kristin Scott Thomas

=== Pinter at the Pinter season ===
- The Lover and The Collection (27 September – 20 October 2018)
- One for the Road, The New World Order, Mountain Language and Ashes to Ashes (28 September – 20 October 2018)
- Landscape and A Kind of Alaska (15 November – 8 December 2018)
- Moonlight and Night School (16 November – 8 December 2018)
- The Room, Family Voices and Victoria Station (3–26 January 2019)
- Party Time and Celebration (4–26 January 2019)
- A Slight Ache and The Dumb Waiter (7–23 February 2019)
- Betrayal (13 March – 8 June 2019) starring Tom Hiddleston, Zawe Ashton and Charlie Cox

=== The Jamie Lloyd Company ===
- Cyrano de Bergerac (3 February – 12 March 2022), adapted by Martin Crimp, starring James McAvoy
- The Seagull (29 June – 10 September 2022) by Anton Chekhov, starring Emilia Clarke

== Notes, references and sources ==
=== Sources ===
- Mander, Raymond; Joe Mitchenson (1961). The Theatres of London. London: Rupert Hart-Davis. OCLC 221877906.
- Parker, John, ed. (1925). Who's Who in the Theatre (Fifth ed.). London: Sir Isaac Pitman and Sons. OCLC 10013159.
