= Family Voices =

First publication cover

Family Voices is a radio play by Harold Pinter written in 1980 and first broadcast on BBC Radio 3 on 22 January 1981.

== Summary ==
Family Voices exposes the story of a mother, son, and dead husband and father through a series of letters that the mother and son have written to one another and that each speaks aloud. The son has moved off to the city and is surrounded by odd characters and circumstances. The mother, who apparently never receives her son's letters, questions angrily why her son never responds to her letters, and brings news of his father's death. Towards the end of the play, the father speaks as it were from the grave, "Just to keep in touch" (81).

A series of interlocking monologues spoken by three Voices (One, Two, and Three), Family Voices exposes themes involving difficulties of communication, the vicissitudes of memory and the past, and family dysfunction familiar from Pinter's other dramatic works, employing some of Pinter's well-known stylistic traits. The peculiar circumstances of the characters evoke the Theatre of the Absurd. The mother and son continually have trouble communicating with each other, resulting in more intense attempts at communication that only serve to make the situation more absurd.

== Productions ==
Première

It was first broadcast as a radio play on BBC Radio 3 on 22 January 1981. Directed by Sir Peter Hall, the cast included:

- Michael Kitchen - Voice One
- Peggy Ashcroft - Voice Two
- Mark Dignam - Voice Three

Subsequently, it was presented in a "platform performance" directed by Hall at London's Cottesloe Theatre with the same cast.

In October 1982, it was presented again as part of Other Places, along with two of Pinter's other works, a one-act play A Kind of Alaska and a shorter play Victoria Station, also directed by Hall. For this production, the cast included:

- Nigel Havers – Voice One
- Anna Massey – Voice Two
- Paul Rogers – Voice Three

Other theatre personnel were:

- John Bury, Design and Lighting
- John Caulfield, Stage Manager
- Kenneth Mackintosh, Staff Director
- Jason Barnes, Production Manager

It was given lunchtime stage performances by the Royal Shakespeare Company at the Barbican Theatre in February and April 1987. The cast included:

- Anton Lesser - Voice One
- Ruby Head - Voice Two
- Mark Dignam - Voice Three

Another theatrical trilogy entitled Other Places, with Pinter's then-newer play One for the Road (1984) instead of Family Voices, was directed by Alan Schneider, in New York City. (This production is not listed on Pinter's official website.)

The play received its West End premiere as part of the Pinter at the Pinter season at the Harold Pinter Theatre in December 2018, directed by Patrick Marber. The cast included:

- Luke Thallon - Voice One
- Jane Horrocks - Voice Two
- Rupert Graves - Voice Three

== Publication ==
The play was first published in the United Kingdom in a spiral binding by Next Editions in 1981, with illustrations by artist Guy Vaesen, a family friend of Harold Pinter and Vivien Merchant, Pinter's first wife (Baker and Ross 85; Billingon, Harold Pinter 134–35).

Later, in 1983, it was published in a volume entitled Other Places, along with A Kind of Alaska and Victoria Station, by Grove Press, Pinter's American publisher, in both hardback and paperback editions (Baker and Ross 85–90).

== Works cited ==
- Harold Pinter: A Bibliographical History (Print). compilers: Baker, William; Ross, John C. London and Delaware: The British Library and New Castle: Oak Knoll Press. 2005. ISBN 978-1-58456-156-9.
- Billington, Michael (2007). Harold Pinter (Print) (2 ed.). London: Faber. ISBN 978-0-571-23476-9.
- Pinter, Harold (1983). Other Places: Three Plays (Print). New York: Grove Press. p. 63–83. ISBN 978-0-8021-5189-6.
- Pinter, Harold (1984). Other Places: Four Plays (Print). New York: Dramatists Play Service. ISBN 978-0-8222-0866-2.
