= Alan Schneider =

American theatre director

- Born: December 12, 1917; Kharkiv, Ukraine
- Died: May 3, 1984 (aged 66); London, England, United Kingdom
- Occupation: Theatre director

Alan Schneider (December 12, 1917 – May 3, 1984) was an American theatre director responsible for more than 100 theatre productions. In 1984 he was honored with a Drama Desk Special Award for serving a wide range of playwrights. He directed the 1956 American premiere of Samuel Beckett's Waiting for Godot, Edward Albee's Who's Afraid of Virginia Woolf? and Tiny Alice; the American première of Joe Orton's Entertaining Mr Sloane, Harold Pinter's The Birthday Party, as well as Pinter's The Dumb Waiter, The Collection, and a trilogy of Pinter's plays under the title Other Places (including One for the Road, Family Voices, and A Kind of Alaska); Bertolt Brecht's The Caucasian Chalk Circle; You Know I Can't Hear You When the Water's Running; and Michael Weller's Moonchildren and Loose Ends.

Schneider also directed Samuel Beckett's only direct foray into the world of film, entitled Film. The short subject starred Buster Keaton and its direction is often misattributed to Samuel Beckett himself, notably during an exhibit at the Louvre in November 2006. "Film" is a silent exploration of Bishop Berkeley's principle 'esse est percipi' (to be is to be perceived).

One of a select group of non-actors awarded membership in The Actors Studio, Schneider taught at Catholic University, City College of the City University of New York, The Juilliard School (where he was director of the theatre program), the University of California, Riverside, and the University of California, San Diego, whose library maintains an archive of his papers. He was associated with Arena Stage for 30 years. He was also the co-artistic director of The Acting Company. At the time of his death, he served as president of the board of directors for Theatre Communications Group (TCG).

== Samuel Beckett and Schneider's death ==
Schneider was a leading director of Samuel Beckett's plays, and there was a Beckettian element in Schneider's death. While in London, Schneider attempted to cross a street in order to mail a letter to Beckett's address in Paris. Stepping off the pavement, the (Ukrainian-born) American director looked to the left for oncoming traffic, momentarily forgetting that motor vehicles in Britain travel on the left side of the road, when he was struck and killed by an oncoming motorcycle.

Schneider was in London taking a break from directing Other Places, a trilogy of plays by Harold Pinter, which was reaching the end of its run in New York City, at the Manhattan Theatre Club. Schneider was then preparing to start rehearsing James Duff's play The War at Home at Hampstead Theatre with Frances Sternhagen, Timothy West and David Threlfall.

Threlfall recounts walking out front at the Hampstead Theatre at lunch break and talking with Schneider the day before the accidental death. On that previous day, intending to cross the London road, Threlfall looked to the right to check the one-way traffic; when he turned and notice that Schneider was stepping into the road without attention. Threlfall pulled him back by the arm. Schneider said promptly "Jeez, I keep thinking I'm in New York". Unfortunately, Threlfall was not there the next day, when he repeated the action on his own, in order to go and post the last letter to Samuel Beckett. The Manhattan Theatre Club lobby featured Schneider's obituary in its last week of performances.

== Alan Schneider memorial fund ==
Following his death, the Alan Schneider Memorial Fund was established by TCG, The Acting Company, and the Stage Directors and Choreographers Society. Proceeds from the Fund go to the Alan Schneider Director Award, which provides national visibility to the recipient as well as a grant to support activities specifically tied to the development of the craft of directing. Recipients of the Alan Schneider Director Award include: Mark Brokaw, Peter C. Brosius, Bart DeLorenzo, Kyle Donnelly, Michael John Garcés, Henry Godinez, Anne Kauffman, Nancy Keystone, Roberta Levitow, Charles Newell, Roman Paska, Mary B. Robinson, David Saint, Joel Sass and Darko Tresnjak.
