= Victoria Station (play) =

1982 play by Harold Pinter

Victoria Station is a short play for two actors by the English playwright Harold Pinter.

== Summary ==
Victoria Station consists of a radio dialogue between a minicab controller (or dispatcher) and a driver (#274) who is stopped by the side of "a dark park" in Crystal Palace, supposedly waiting further instructions. The stage directions Lights up on office. CONTROLLER sitting at microphone and Lights up on DRIVER in car (45) alternate between these settings.

The controller attempts to instruct the driver to pick up a client from Victoria Station, but the driver declines to move, focusing on his current client (who is apparently unmoving, perhaps even dead, in the back seat). The Controller's mood shifts through various degrees of mystification towards irritation and then possibly compassion masking some more nefarious intention of what to do with this Driver.

Lasting fewer than ten minutes, the play's tone is mostly comic, as the Controller becomes more and more frantic at the Driver's recalcitrance; however, as the play develops, the Controller's orders become increasingly ominous threats: "Drop your passenger. Drop your passenger at his chosen destination and proceed to Victoria Station. Otherwise I'll destroy you bone by bone. I'll suck you in and blow you out in little bubbles. I'll chew your stomach out with my own teeth. I'll eat all the hair off your body. You'll end up looking like a pipe cleaner? Get me?" (58). But Driver reveals that this client is a young female with whom he has "fallen in love" (possibly "for the first time") and from whom he refuses to part, imagining that he will even marry her and that they will "die together in this car", despite the previous admission that he is already married to a wife probably "asleep in bed" and the father of (perhaps) "a little daughter"—"Yes, I think that's what she is" (55).

The play becomes more somber in tone, as the Controller tries to assure the fearfully insecure Driver that all will be fine, finally cajoling him to "stay exactly where" he is, as the Controller prepares to leave "this miserable freezing fucking office"—obsessed in turn by the Driver and the fact that "nobody loves me"—in search of him, saying that he imagines them sharing a holiday together on Barbados (59). In response to the Driver's repeated plea, "Don't leave me" (53–54), the Controller may be prepared to "help" him (as he insists), but one may still wonder if he might actually retain some more menacing possibility (60–62).

== Premiere ==
It was first performed at the National Theatre, London, on 14 October 1982. The performers were Paul Rogers as the Controller and Martin Jarvis as the Driver. The same cast recorded a radio version for BBC Radio 3, directed by John Tydeman and first transmitted on 15 August 1986.

== Publication ==
The sketch is published in Other Places: Three Plays, including also A Kind of Alaska and Family Voices (Grove Press, 1983), and also in Other Places: Four Plays by Harold Pinter (Dramatists Play Service, 1984).

== Subsequent productions ==
Douglas Hodge directed Robert Glenister and Rufus Sewell in a 15-minute film version, released in 2003 by Alcove Entertainment.

Victoria Station was among the short works included in a 2007 London production entitled Pinter's People, in which Bill Bailey played the minicab controller and Kevin Eldon played the cab driver. According to Benedict Nightingale's mostly negative review of Pinter's People in the Times, Victoria Station (along with Night), was among the few sketches performed effectively.

== See also ==
- List of works by Harold Pinter

== Works cited ==
- Pinter, Harold. Other Places: Four Plays. New York: Dramatists Play Service, 1984. ISBN 0-8222-0866-0. [Also includes One for the Road, along with A Kind of Alaska, Victoria Station, and Family Voices.]
- –––. Other Places: Three Plays (A Kind of Alaska, Victoria Station, and Family Voices). Pbk edn, New York: Grove Press, 1983. ISBN 0-8021-5189-2 (Page references to the paperback edition appear within parentheses above.) [Victoria Station appears on 41–62.]
