= Shantanu Biswas =

Bangladeshi dramatist, playwright, stage director, singer-songwriter and composer

Santanu Biswas
- শান্তনু বিশ্বাস
- Biswas
- Born: 25 October 1954; Chittagong, East Bengal, Pakistan (now Bangladesh)
- Died: 12 July 2019 (aged 64); Dhaka, Bangladesh
- Citizenship: Pakistani (1954-1971); Bangladeshi (1971-2019)
- Education: National University of Bangladesh
- Occupations: dramatist; playwright; stage director; singer-songwriter; composer
- Years active: 1975–2019
- Website: shantanubiswas.info

Shantanu Biswas (25 October 1954 – 12 July 2019) was a Bangladeshi dramatist, playwright, stage director, singer-songwriter and composer. He has written and directed several full-length plays between 1975 and 2019, where he performed as an actor in more than sixteen plays. His major successes include Informer (1982), and Julius Caesar er Shesh Shaat Din (The Last Seven Days of Julius Caesar) (1987).

Born in Chittagong (now Chattogram), Biswas spent his whole life in the port city, where he struggled to establish himself as a dramatist and musician. He has released five solo and two mixed albums. He made his debut album Chirkut in 2009. His last solo Sritir Shohore was released posthumously in 2019 by G-Series. His music as blended with modern poetry, and lyrics with diverse tunes covering different genres of world music.

== Early life and career ==
Shantanu Biswas was born on 25 October 1954 in Chittagong, East Pakistan (now Bangladesh). He attended Saint Placid's High School and Government Hazi Mohammad Mohsin College in Chattogram. In 1971, the Bangladesh Liberation War started, and Biswas moved to India and worked with the Swadhin Bangla Betar Kendra as its youngest artist. After the war, he returned to Chattogram, finished his education, and was soon employed at the conglomerate Ispahani Limited, where he served as the Chief Operational Officer of the Tea Department until his death in 2019. He was also chairman of Tea Traders Association of Bangladesh (TTAB).

== Theater ==
Biswas had an interest in drama and theatre from his young age. He got his start in theatre as an actor; later on, he began his career as an original playwright, director, and translating foreign plays into Bengali, most of which he also directed. In 1974, Biswas worked with the theatre group Gonayon and later with Angon in 1976. Kalo Golaper Desh is the first play written by him. Then he wrote Doptori Raj Dawptore and Nobojonmo. In 1982, he started his theatre group, Kal Purush Natto Shomproday. His prominent plays include Informer (1982), which was staged internationally and adapted by multiple other groups, as well as Julius Caesar er Shesh Shaat Din (The Last Seven Days of Julius Caesar) in 1987.

Biswas translated several foreign plays into Bengali, such as Manush O Niyoti from the original play by George Bernard Shaw, Matri Chorit original play by Alan Ayckbourn, Prarthi translated from original play Applicant (1959) by Harold Pinter and Khola Hawa original play by N. F. Simpson. He was also the editor of a theatre magazine, Proscenium, since 1983.

== Music career ==
Biswas's first album, Jhinuk Jhinuk Mon, was released in 2007 from Impress Audio Vision Ltd. It was a mixed album with fellow Bangladeshi singer Arunima Islam. In 2008, he released a second mixed album, Bawhoman, along with Bappa Mazumder.

Biswas released his first solo album, Chirkut in 2009, which attained widespread popularity with its singles "Dekhechi Shada Kalo Shari" and "Chirkute Dekhi Chotto Kore Lekha". His second solo Postman was released on 9 July 2011 from Agniveena. His third solo Khorkuto was released on 29 March 2014 from Agniveena. This album includes 11 tracks where all the lyrics and tunes were composed by Shantanu himself. Bappa Mazumder and Sudipto Saha have coordinated the music of the album. His fourth studio album Shob Tomader Jonno was released in 2015. His fifth and last solo Sritir Shohore was released posthumously on 5 October 2019 by G-Series.

== Personal life and death ==
Biswas was married to fellow stage-actress Shubhra Biswas in 1984 and has two daughters.

On 12 July 2019, he died from cardiac arrest in United Hospital, Dhaka, Bangladesh. As a lifelong humanist philosopher, he donated his body for medical research to the Anatomy Department, Chittagong Medical College, the first-ever donated cadaver in the College's entire history.

== Legacy ==
After his death, the Drama Department of the Chittagong University launched a scholarship program dedicated to Biswas, named, "Nattojon Shantanu Biswas Smriti Britti" for students with outstanding academic results in the field of drama and theatre.

He has also received several awards, most prominently the Zia Haider Memorial Drama Medal in 2013.

== Dramatography ==
Title	Year	Credited as				Notes	Ref(s)
Title	Year	Writer	Director	Actor	Translator	Notes	Ref(s)
Kalo Golaper Desh		Yes	—N/a	Yes	—N/a	first performed 1978	
Doptori Raj Dawptore		Yes	—N/a	Yes	—N/a	first performed 1979	
Nobojonmo		Yes	Yes	Yes	—N/a	first performed 1981	
Jai Din Fagun Din		—N/a	—N/a	Yes	—N/a	first performed 21 February 1976	
Informer	1980–81	Yes	Yes	Yes	—N/a	first performed 1983	
Bhaboghura (The Wanderer)		Yes	Yes	Yes	—N/a	first performed January 2001	
Kanamachi	1992	—N/a	Yes	—N/a	—N/a		
Khirer Putul		—N/a	Yes	—N/a	Yes		
Rupoboti O Bamon Shatjona		—N/a	Yes	—N/a	—N/a		
Gofur Ameena Shongbad		—N/a	—N/a	Yes	—N/a		
Chawrjapoder Horini		—N/a	—N/a	Yes	—N/a	first performed January 1976	
Ekti Obastob Golpo		—N/a	—N/a	Yes	—N/a		
Ameena Shundori		—N/a	—N/a	Yes	—N/a	first performed October 1976	
Bajlo Rajar BaroTa		—N/a	—N/a	Yes	—N/a	first performed 1979	
Mohesh		—N/a	—N/a	Yes	—N/a		
Juta Abishkar		—N/a	—N/a	Yes	—N/a		
Julius Caesar Er Shesh Shatdin		—N/a	Yes	Yes	—N/a	first performed 1987	
Manush O Niyoti	1990	—N/a	Yes	Yes	—N/a	Origin: George Bernard Shaw	
Mrinaler Chithi	2004	—N/a	—N/a	—N/a	Yes		
Matri Chorit	2015	—N/a	—N/a	—N/a	Yes	Origin: Alan Ayckbourn	
Prarthi	2015	—N/a	—N/a	—N/a	Yes	Origin: Applicant (1959) by Harold Pinter	
Khola Hawa	2015	—N/a	—N/a	—N/a	Yes	Origin: N. F. Simpson	
Nirvar	2019	Yes	Yes	Yes	—N/a	first performed 28 June 2019	

== Discography ==
=== Studio albums ===
Title	Album details	Tracklist
Chirkut	Released: 2009; Label: G-Series; Format: CD	Tracklist: 1. "Road Brishty Jhor e" (3:45); 2. "Chirkute Dekhi Chotto Kore Lekha" (3:46); 3. "Kathalchapar Gondhe Bibhore" (5:09); 4. "Jadhughor ar Aziz Super" (3:50); 5. "Dekhechi Shada Kalo Shari" (5:04); 6. "Jey Meyeti Burigongar Dhar e" (3:45); 7. "Bhije Megh e Dupur Jodi Hoy" (3:45); 8. "Ghum Ghum Maya Maya Lagchey" (3:37); 9. "Akdin Shobai Dukkho Bhule Bolbe Esho" (4:33); 10. "Amon Borsha Tao Nodi Holona" (4:17)
Postman	Released: 9 July 2011; Label: Agniveena; Format: CD	Tracklist: 1. "Postman" (5:27); 2. "Tumi Chuye Dile" (5:05); 3. "Shobar E Sreshtho Somoy" (4:03); 4. "Tomay Niye" (4:29); 5. "Megher Onek Upore" (4:18); 6. "Ekhane Amra Kojon" (3:54); 7. "Jodi Footpath" (4:43)
Khorkuto	Released: 29 March 2014; Label: Agniveena; Format: CD	Tracklist: 1. "Ki Hoil Ki Hoil" (3:40); 2. "Probonchona" (4:22); 3. "Bodle Bodle Jacche" (4:44); 4. "Swopno Shimahin" (3:25); 5. "Prochare Proshar" (3:31); 6. "Goplo" (4:12); 7. "Khorkuto" (3:14); 8. "Chatimtola" (3:44); 9. "Gaan Vanga Ghore" (3:19); 10. "Cheleti" (4:05); 11. "Boli Khela" (3:48)
Shob Tomader Jonno	Released: 2015; Label: Girona Entertainment, India; Format: CD	Tracklist: 1. "Bangla Bangladesh" (5:24); 2. "Khoj" (4:28); 3. "Tomader Jonno" (4:30); 4. "Lojja" (5:13); 5. "Dotanay" (4:45); 6. "Abul Kalam" (4:09); 7. "Reporter" (4:54); 8. "Etota Poth Ekay" (4:35)
Sritir Shohore	Released: 5 October 2019; Label: G-Series; Format: CD	Tracklist: 1. "Shomoyer Chakata" (3:26); 2. "Krishnokoli" (4:49); 3. "Emono Dine Tare" (4:16); 4. "Dekhchi Aar Vabchi" (3:44); 5. "Bolle Ami Jai" (3:49); 6. "Sritir Shohore" (4:29); 7. "Shokal Belar Pakhi" (3:56); 8. "Dheu Tolo" (3:57)

=== Mixed albums ===
Title	Album details	Tracklist
Jhinuk Jhinuk Mon (with Arunima Islam)	Released: 2007; Label: Impress Audio Vision Ltd.; Format: CD	Tracklist: 1. "Jhinuk Jhinuk Mon" (4:20); 2. "Jhinuk Jhinuk Mon" (4:06); 3. "Amar Piya Ashe Jaay" (5:02); 4. "Moner Kotha Mone Rekhe Dile" (3:49); 5. "Chailei Shob Pawa Jeto Jodi" (5:22)
Bawhoman (with Bappa Mazumder)	Released: 2008; Label: Agniveena; Format: CD	Tracklist: 1. "Je Akash Dorte Chay" (5:11); 2. "Haat ta ke Chueso" (4:01); 3. "Sokal Bikal Vhabi" (4:01); 4. "Muk Thekhe Oor Ber Houa" (3:31); 5. "Taar Alta Deya Payete" (4:49)

== Bibliography ==
- Two Plays: Informer and Bhoboghure (2002)
- Shantanu Bishash-er Charti Natok (2018)
- Nattotroyie (2019)
- Khirer Putul (2016)
- Gaaner Kobita Khola Pith (2018)
- Proscenium (2020, July), edited, posthumous, ISBN 9789848241288
