= Pinter's People =

Pinter's People is a compilation of revue sketches or short prose works by Harold Pinter, which was performed for four weeks from 30 January 2007, at the Haymarket Theatre, in London, starring Bill Bailey, Geraldine McNulty, Sally Phillips, and Kevin Eldon. The show was assembled by Bailey and directed by Sean Foley.

It included:

- Apart From That (first performed 2006)
- The Black and White (1959)
- Last to Go (1959)
- The New World Order (1991)
- Night (1969)
- Precisely (1983)
- Press Conference (2002)
- Request Stop (1959)
- Special Offer (1959)
- Tess (2000)
- That's All (sketch)|That's All (1959)
- That's Your Trouble (1959)
- Trouble in the Works (1959)
- Victoria Station (1982)

== Critical response ==
Charles Spencer in The Daily Telegraph described the show as "one of the most punishingly unfunny evenings I have ever endured in a theatre." In The Guardian, Michael Billington commented, "Pinter’s people [sic] have been turned into lurching grotesques and the result does a grave disservice both to the writer and comic acting." Benedict Nightingale in The Times wrote: "Last night I was sickened by some of the coarsest performances I have ever seen in a London playhouse", before going on to praise the second half of the show. The Observer was more favourable however, mentioning "the great pleasures of the evening" and praised the performers.

Pinter himself was quick to defend the cast and the show, saying "I'm all for it. I admire these people in Pinter's People. I really think they're a great bunch - they're so robust and energetic. I think they were terrific."
