= Night (sketch) =

Night is a dramatic sketch by the English playwright Harold Pinter, presented as one of eight short dramatic works about marriage in the program Mixed Doubles: An Entertainment on Marriage at the Comedy Theatre, London, on 9 April 1969; directed by Alexander Doré, this production included Nigel Stock as the Man and Pinter's first wife, Vivien Merchant, as the Woman (54). It replaced another sketch performed previously in the program We Who Are About To... at the Hampstead Theatre Club on 6 February 1969; each of the original eight sketches about marriage also featured two characters.

This dramatic sketch is a duologue between a married couple "in their forties" (54). As they "sit with coffee" (54), they reminisce about when they first met and fell in love during their youth. The tone of the sketch is both gently comic and wistful, as Pinter exposes some present emotional disjunction between the characters through their dialogue about their past, which they remember differently. They have at least one child, as the wife thinks she "heard a child crying, […] a child, waking up" in their house, whereas the husband responds, "There was no sound. […] The house is silent" (57).

== Productions ==
Night was among the sketches included in Sketches II, the second of a two-part programme, produced on 8 (I) and 11 February 2002 (II), at the Lyttelton Theatre, Royal National Theatre, in London ("Sketches", haroldpinter.org).

Cast

- Douglas Hodge as Man
- Catherine McCormack as Woman

Critical reception

Alastair Macaulay, chief dance critic for the New York Times, reviewed the National Theatre production while still drama critic for the London Financial Times; in this portion of his review of the whole program reprinted on Pinter's official website, he writes:

[Pinter's] 1969 Night is beautifully acted by Douglas Hodge and Catherine McCormack. He recalls that the first time he held her was on a bridge; he recalls holding her breasts in his hands. She recalls no bridge, she recalls a different place, she recalls how he took her hand and gently stroked it. Has anyone ever caught more finely the differences between male and female feelings about heterosexual love than Pinter? Here, their differences of memory become almost a tragic divide. These two live together in what they call love, and yet on the memories of their initial and most intimate moments there is this unchangeable discrepancy. This hairline crack could become an abyss - at times it seems very large, but they live with it calmly. Pinter, now in his 70s, can still seem the most modern playwright alive, but again and again he puts himself at the end of long traditions. He is, it often seems, the last modernist, the last classicist, and, in plays like Night, the last romantic.

It was also produced again as part of Pinter's People, at the Haymarket Theatre, in London, running for four weeks beginning on 30 January 2007.

== Publication ==
It was first published with Pinter's two one-act plays Landscape (1968) and Silence (1969), by Methuen, in London, in 1969, and by Grove Press, in New York, in 1970.

== Works cited ==
- Macaulay, Alastair. "The Playwright's Triple Risk: Pinter Sketches - Royal National Theatre". Financial Times 13 Feb. 2002. Rpt. in "Sketches (2002) Royal National Theatre, London". HaroldPinter.org. Harold Pinter, 2000–2003. Accessed 22 Apr. 2009.
- Pinter, Harold. Landscape and Silence. 1st edn., London: Methuen, 1969.
- –––. Night. 53–61 in Landscape and Silence. Evergreen Original series, E-555, New York: Grove Press, 1970. ISBN 0-394-17289-2. (Parenthetical page references are to this edition.)
