= Mixed Doubles (play) =

Mixed Doubles: An Entertainment on Marriage (London: Methuen, 1970) is a programme consisting of a series of eight short plays or revue sketches, each with two characters, composed by various English playwrights. It was first performed on 6 February 1969 in the Hampstead Theatre Club with the title, We Who Are About To.... The programme was then presented as Mixed Doubles: An Entertainment on Marriage at the Comedy Theatre, London, on 9 April 1969.

The eight dramatic sketches, each portraying marriage at a different stage of life, are linked together by a series of anti-authoritarian monologues written by George Melly. Taken together, the programme presents an acidly humorous image of marriage from the moment of blessing to the silver wedding anniversary. In the course of the programme, many people appear on stage in various professional roles. The characters in Mixed Doubles appear to be plagued by everyday trivialities, their pasts, their jobs, and their marital problems.

== The revue sketches ==
- "The Vicar", by George Melly
- "A Man's Best Friend", by James Saunders
- "The Bank Manager", by George Melly
- "Score", by Lyndon Brook
- "The Lawyer", by George Melly
- "Norma", by Alun Owen
- "The Nannie", by George Melly
- "Night", by Harold Pinter
- "The Psychoanalyst", by George Melly
- "Permanence", by Fay Weldon
- "The Doctor", by George Melly
- "Countdown", by Alan Ayckbourn
- "The Union Official", by George Melly
- "The Silver Wedding", by John Griffith Bowen
- "The Director", by George Melly
- "Resting Place", by David Campton

Two other monologues by George Melly, "The Headmaster" and "The Advertising Man", were included in the published version as an appendix.

On "Countdown," by Alan Ayckbourn, from "One Act Plays" (alanayckbourn.net):

In February 1969, the piece [Countdown] is premiered as We Who Are About To... at Hampstead Theatre Club with the original cast now joined by Nigel Stock and Vivien Merchant. Direction is credited to both Alexander Doré and Anton Rodgers and the programme is largely the same with John Gorrie's piece replaced with one by Alun Owen.

The production transferred to the Comedy Theatre in London, under yet another title revision of Mixed Doubles. However, the production was not quite finished: Lyndon's Brooks piece originally titled Mixed Doubles was altered to "Score" and a new piece by Harold Pinter ["Night"] replaced Julia Jones' contribution.

The final piece in the Countdown puzzle is a recently discovered television adaptation, which was broadcast in December 1972 as part of the Full House arts programme. It featured Sheila Hancock and Clive Dunn as the husband and wife.

Mixed Doubles was published in 1977 [sic: in fact 1970] and remains popular to this day. [Italics and bold print added.]
