= Peggy Ashcroft =

English actress (1907–1991)

Dame Peggy Ashcroft DBE
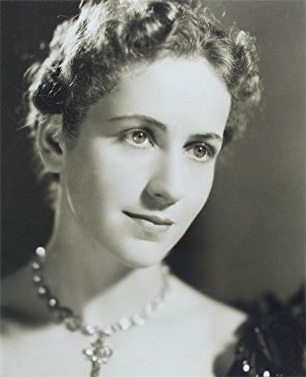
- Ashcroft in 1936
- Born: 22 December 1907; Croydon, Surrey, England
- Died: 14 June 1991 (aged 83); Hampstead, London, England
- Education: Royal Central School of Speech and Drama
- Occupation: Actress
- Years active: 1929–1991
- Spouses: Rupert Hart-Davis (m. 1929; div. 1933) Theodore Komisarjevsky (m. 1934; div. 1936) Jeremy Hutchinson (m. 1940; div. 1965)
- Children: 2
- Relatives: Emily Loizeau (granddaughter)

Dame Edith Margaret Emily "Peggy" Ashcroft DBE (22 December 1907 – 14 June 1991) was an English actress whose career spanned more than six decades, both on screen and stage.

Born to a middle-class family in Croydon, Surrey, Ashcroft was determined from an early age to become an actress, despite parental opposition. She was working in smaller theatres even before graduating from drama school, and within two years she was starring in the West End. Ashcroft maintained her leading place in British theatre for the next 50 years. Always attracted by the ideals of permanent theatrical ensembles, she did much of her work for the Old Vic in the early 1930s, John Gielgud's companies in the 1930s and 1940s, the Shakespeare Memorial Theatre and its successor the Royal Shakespeare Company from the 1950s, and the National Theatre from the 1970s.

While well regarded in Shakespeare, Ashcroft was also known for her commitment to modern drama, appearing in plays by Bertolt Brecht, Samuel Beckett and Harold Pinter. Her career was almost wholly spent in the live theatre until the 1980s. She then turned to television and cinema with considerable success, winning three BAFTAs, one Volpi Cup, one Golden Globe Award and an Academy Award, and received nominations for an additional Golden Globe Award and two Primetime Emmy Awards.

== Life and career ==
=== Early years ===
Ashcroft was born in Croydon, Surrey, (now in Greater London) the younger child and only daughter of Violetta Maud, née Bernheim (1874–1926) and William Worsley Ashcroft (1878–1918), a land agent. According to Michael Billington, her biographer, Violetta Ashcroft was of Danish and German Jewish descent and a keen amateur actress. Ashcroft's father was killed on active service in the First World War. She attended Woodford School, East Croydon, where one of her teachers encouraged her love of Shakespeare, but neither her teachers nor her mother approved of her desire to become a professional actress. Ashcroft was determined, however, and at the age of 16, she enrolled at the Central School of Speech and Drama, run by Elsie Fogerty, from whom her mother had taken lessons some years before. The school's emphasis was on the voice and elegant diction, which did not appeal to Ashcroft or to her fellow pupil Laurence Olivier. She learned more from reading My Life in Art by Constantin Stanislavski, the influential director of the Moscow Art Theatre.

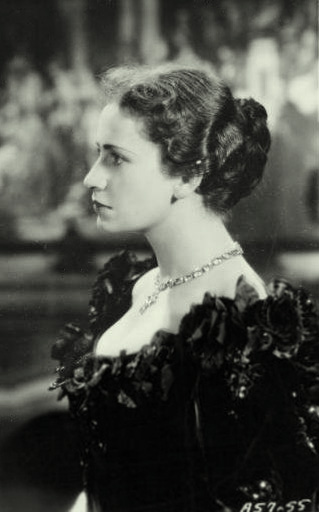
Ashcroft in 1936

While still a student, Ashcroft made her professional stage debut at the Birmingham Repertory Theatre in a revival of J. M. Barrie's Dear Brutus opposite Ralph Richardson, with whom she had been greatly impressed when she saw him in Charles Doran's touring company while she was still a schoolgirl. She graduated from the Central School in 1927 with London University's Diploma in Dramatic Art. Never much drawn to the West End or stardom, she learned her craft with mostly small companies in fringe theatres. Her first notable West End role was Naemi in Jew Süss in 1929, an extravagantly theatrical production, in which she won praise for the naturalism and truth of her playing. In the same year she married Rupert Hart-Davis, then an aspiring actor and later a publisher. He later described the marriage as "a sad failure: we were much too young to know what we wanted ... after much agony we parted and were duly divorced. Nowadays Peggy and I lunch together perhaps once or twice a year in a Soho restaurant and have a lovely nostalgic-romantic talk of shared memories of long ago. She is a lovely person and the best actress living."

=== 1930s ===
In 1930 Ashcroft was cast as Desdemona in a production of Othello at the Savoy Theatre, starring Paul Robeson in the title role. The production was not well received, but Ashcroft's notices were excellent. The production prompted a political awakening in Ashcroft, who was astonished to receive hate mail for appearing onstage with a black actor; she was angry that Robeson was not welcome at the Savoy Hotel, despite being the star at the adjoining Savoy Theatre. During the run she had a brief affair with Robeson, which caused Robeson and his wife Essie Robeson to temporarily split up. Their affair, followed by another with the writer J. B. Priestley, ended Ashcroft's first marriage. Hart-Davis was granted a divorce in 1933, on the grounds of Ashcroft's adultery with the director Theodore Komisarjevsky.

Among those impressed by Ashcroft's performance as Desdemona was John Gielgud, recently established as a West End star. He recalled, "When Peggy came on in the Senate scene it was as if all the lights in the theatre had suddenly gone up". In 1932 he was invited by the Oxford University Dramatic Society to try his hand at directing, in the society's production of Romeo and Juliet. Ashcroft as Juliet and Edith Evans as the nurse won golden notices, although their director, already notorious for his innocent slips of the tongue, referred to them as "Two leading ladies, the like of whom I hope I shall never meet again."

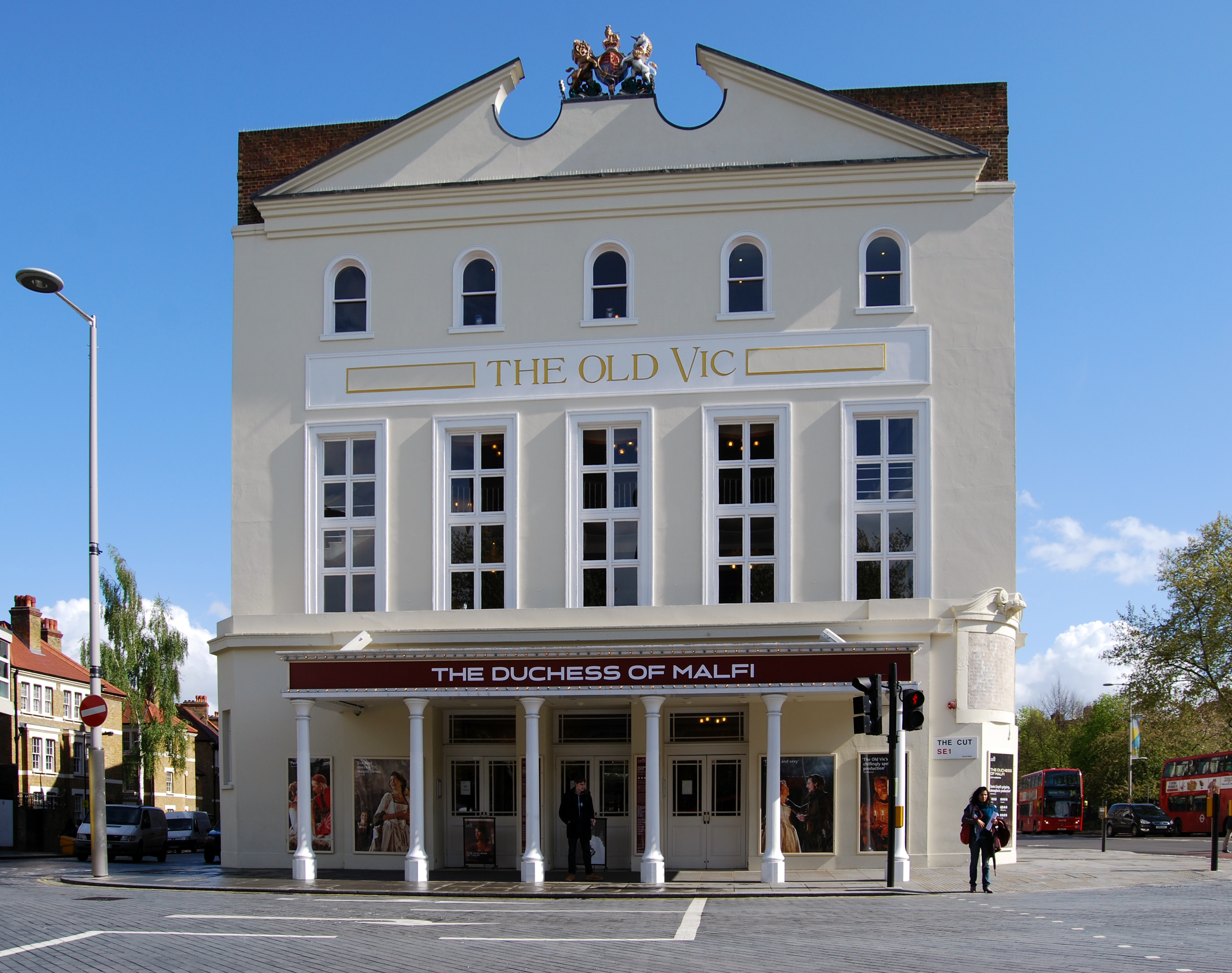
The Old Vic, photographed in 2012

Ashcroft joined the Old Vic company for the 1932–33 season. The theatre, in an unfashionable area of London south of the Thames, was run by Lilian Baylis to offer plays and operas to a mostly working-class audience at low ticket prices. She paid her performers modest wages, but the theatre was known for its unrivaled repertory of classics, mostly Shakespeare, and many West End stars took a large pay cut to work there. It was, in Sheridan Morley's words, the place to learn Shakespearean technique and try new ideas. During the season Ashcroft played five Shakespeare heroines, (Note: Cleopatra in Antony and Cleopatra, Imogen in Cymbeline, Rosalind in As You Like It, Portia in The Merchant of Venice and Miranda in The Tempest.) as well as Kate in She Stoops to Conquer, Mary Stuart in a new play by John Drinkwater, and Lady Teazle in The School for Scandal. In 1933 she made her first film, The Wandering Jew. She was not attracted to the medium of cinema and made only four more films over the next quarter-century.

During her professional and personal relationship with Komisarjevsky, whom she married in 1934 and left in 1936, Ashcroft learned from him what Billington calls "the vital importance of discipline, perfectionism, and the idea that the actor, even during passages of emotional stress, must remain a thinking human being".

After appearing in the Hitchcock film The 39 Steps (1935), and a succession of stage failures, Ashcroft was once again cast as Juliet by Gielgud, this time in a West End production that attracted enormous attention. It ran from October 1935 to March 1936, and Ashcroft's Romeos were played in alternation by Olivier and Gielgud. Critical opinions differed as to the relative merits of her leading men, but Ashcroft won glowing reviews. In May 1936 Komisarjevsky directed a production of The Seagull, with Evans as Arkadina, Gielgud as Trigorin and Ashcroft as Nina. The recent collapse of her marriage to the director made rehearsals difficult, but the critical reception was ecstatic.

After playing briefly and without much pleasure in New York, Ashcroft returned to London in 1937 for a season of four plays presented by Gielgud at the Queen's Theatre. She played the Queen in Richard II, Lady Teazle in The School for Scandal, Irina in Three Sisters and Portia in The Merchant of Venice. The company included Harry Andrews, Glen Byam Shaw, George Devine, Michael Redgrave and Harcourt Williams, with Angela Baddeley and Gwen Ffrangcon-Davies as guests. The directors were Gielgud himself, Tyrone Guthrie and Michel Saint-Denis. Billington considers that this company laid the foundations of post-war ensembles such as the Royal Shakespeare Company and the National Theatre. The Munich crisis and the approach of the Second World War delayed for a decade the further development of such a company.

=== 1940s and 1950s ===
In 1940, Ashcroft met and married the rising lawyer Jeremy Hutchinson. They had a daughter, Eliza, the following year, and Ashcroft did little stage work while the child was young. Her main appearances during the war years were in Gielgud's company at the Haymarket Theatre in 1944, playing Ophelia in Hamlet, Titania in A Midsummer Night's Dream and the title role in The Duchess of Malfi. She won excellent notices, but the productions were thought to lack flair and were unfavourably compared with the exciting work of the rival Old Vic company under Richardson and Olivier's leadership. After the Haymarket season Ashcroft resumed her break from the theatre, first campaigning for her husband, who stood as a Labour candidate in the 1945 general election, and then having a second child, Nicholas, in 1946.

Returning to the stage in 1947, Ashcroft had two long-running successes in a row as the alcoholic Evelyn Holt in Edward, My Son, in the West End and then on Broadway, and the downtrodden Catherine Sloper in The Heiress in 1949.

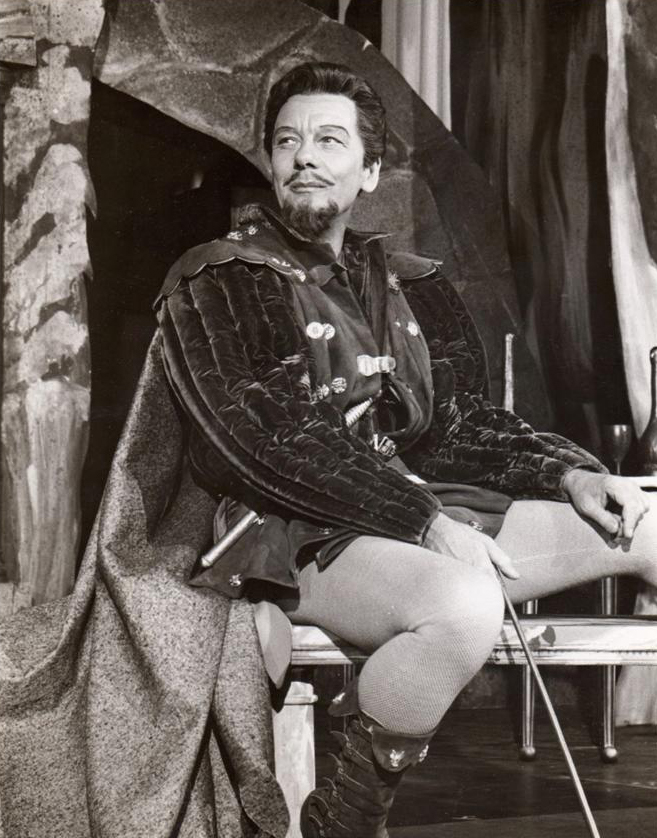
Gielgud as Benedick

Ashcroft began the 1950s with a return to Shakespeare, at the Shakespeare Memorial Theatre, Stratford-upon-Avon, playing Beatrice to Gielgud's Benedick in Much Ado About Nothing and Cordelia to his King Lear. In 1951 she returned to the Old Vic, playing Viola in Twelfth Night, the title role in Electra and Mistress Page in The Merry Wives of Windsor. In the second of these, according to Billington, "she scaled the austere peaks of Greek tragedy".

Through the rest of the decade, Ashcroft's career switched between commercial productions in the West End and appearances in the nascent subsidised theatres in Shakespeare and experimental works. In the former she made a deep impression as the adulterous, suicidal Hester Collyer in Terence Rattigan's The Deep Blue Sea (1952) and was well reviewed as the governess Miss Madrigal in Enid Bagnold's The Chalk Garden (1956). Her roles for non-commercial managements were in Shakespeare at Stratford and on tour, (Note: Cleopatra (1953), Beatrice (1955), Rosalind (1957) and Imogen in Cymbeline (1957).) Hedda Gabler (1954) and the double role of Shen Te and Shui Ta in The Good Woman of Setzuan (1956). The last of these was not a success, but Ashcroft was credited with courage for taking the role on.

In 1958, Peter Hall, who had been appointed to run the Shakespeare Memorial Theatre, approached Ashcroft with his plans for a permanent company, with bases in Stratford and London, and a regular, salaried company, presenting a mixture of classical and new plays. Ashcroft immediately agreed to join him, and her lead was, in Hall's view, key to the success of the new Royal Shakespeare Company (RSC).

=== 1960s ===
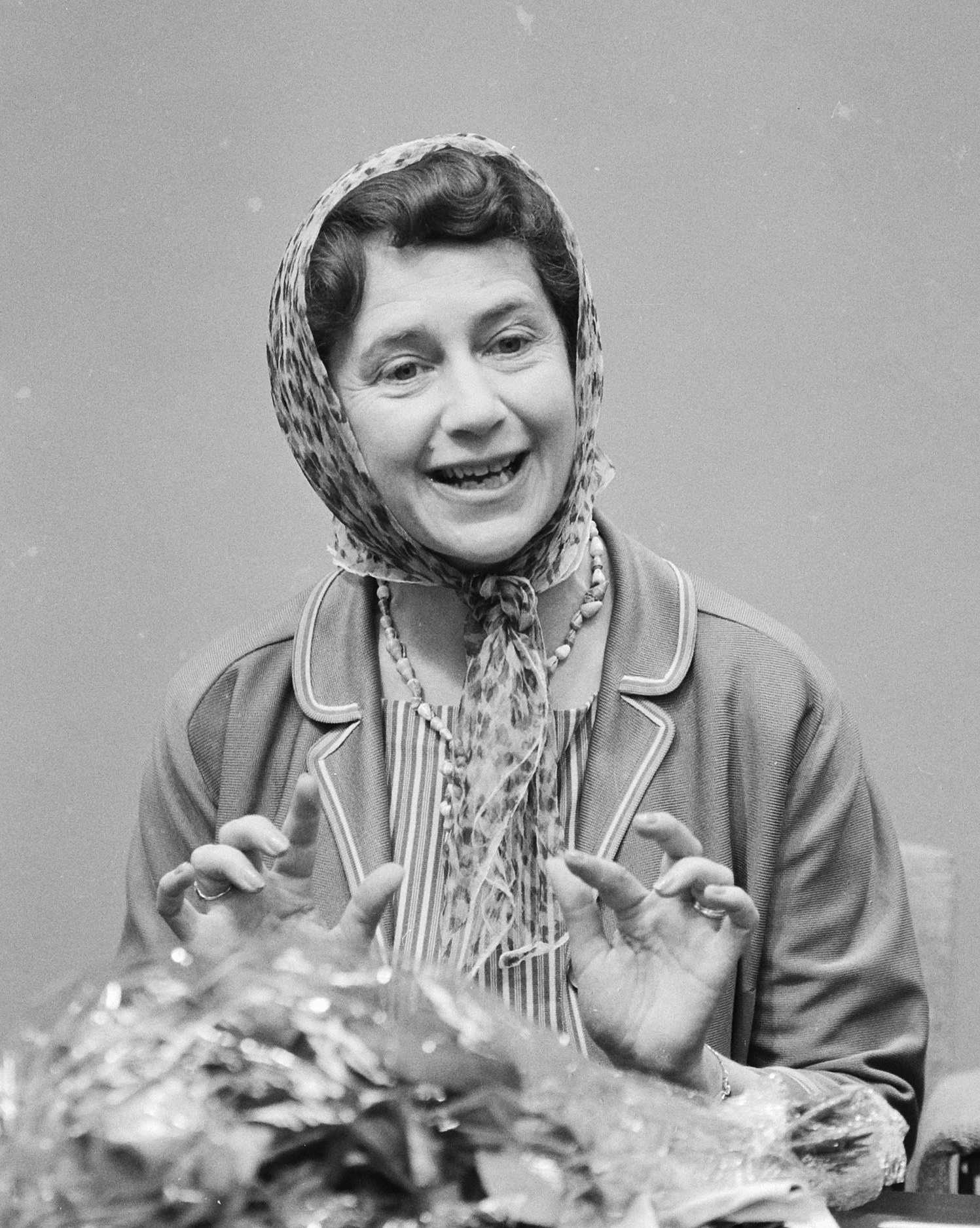
Ashcroft in 1962

In the RSC's first seasons Ashcroft played Katharina in The Taming of the Shrew, Paulina in The Winter's Tale (1960), The Duchess of Malfi (1961), Emilia in Othello (1961) and Ranevskaya in The Cherry Orchard, opposite Gielgud as Gaev. These were generally well reviewed, but her performance in The Wars of the Roses in 1963 and 1964 had the critics searching for superlatives. The production was a reshaping of Shakespeare's three Henry VI plays and Richard III. Ashcroft, then aged fifty-six, played Margaret of Anjou, ageing from blithe youth to ferocious old age as the plays progressed. The critic Philip Hope-Wallace wrote of:

... the quite marvellous, fearsome performance of Dame Peggy Ashcroft as Margaret of Anjou, who skipped on to the stage, a lightfooted, ginger, sub-deb sub-bitch at about 11.35 a.m. and was last seen, a bedraggled crone with glittering eye, rambling and cussing with undiminished fury, 11 hours later, having grown before our eyes into a vexed and contumacious queen, a battle-axe and a maniac monster of rage and cruelty ... even the stoniest gaze was momentarily lowered from this gorgon.

At about this time Ashcroft's third and last marriage was beginning to fall apart. According to Billington she found solace in her work, and threw herself into classical and avant garde works "with ever greater fervour". Her roles in the 1960s were Arkadina in The Seagull (1964), Mother in Marguerite Duras's Days in the Trees (1966), Mrs Alving in Ibsen's Ghosts (1967), Agnes in Edward Albee's A Delicate Balance (1969), Beth in Pinter's Landscape (1969) and Katharine of Aragon in Henry VIII (1969).

=== Later years ===
In the 1970s, Ashcroft remained a pillar of the RSC but when Peter Hall succeeded Olivier as director of the National Theatre in 1973 he persuaded her to appear there from time to time. She also appeared at the Royal Court in Duras's The Lovers of Viorne (1971) in the role of a schizophrenic killer, a performance that the young Helen Mirren found so accomplished that "I just wanted to rush out and start all over again". Many were surprised when Ashcroft appeared with Richardson at the Savoy in 1972 in what was by all appearances a conventional West End drawing room comedy, Lloyd George Knew My Father, by William Douglas-Home, but the two stars revealed unexpected depths in their characters.

For the National, Ashcroft appeared in Ibsen's John Gabriel Borkman, Beckett's Happy Days, Lillian Hellman's Watch on the Rhine and Pinter's Family Voices. Her RSC roles were Lidya in Aleksei Arbuzov's Old World (1976), and her last stage part was the Countess in All's Well That Ends Well, which she played at Stratford in 1981 and in London in 1982.

Ashcroft later made occasional, but highly successful, television and film appearances. For The Jewel in the Crown she won a BAFTA award for best actress in 1984, and for her portrayal of Mrs. Moore in David Lean's 1984 film A Passage to India she won another BAFTA best actress award and the 1985 Oscar for Best Supporting Actress; this made her the oldest person to win the Oscar for Best Supporting Actress, at 77 years 93 days old. Her final performance was also in a work about India, the radio play In the Native State by Tom Stoppard.

She was the grandmother of the French singer Emily Loizeau.

Ashcroft died of a stroke in London at the age of 83. Her ashes were scattered around a mulberry tree in the Great Garden at New Place, Stratford-upon-Avon, which she had planted in 1969. A memorial service was held in Westminster Abbey on 30 November 1991.

== Honours, awards and memorials ==
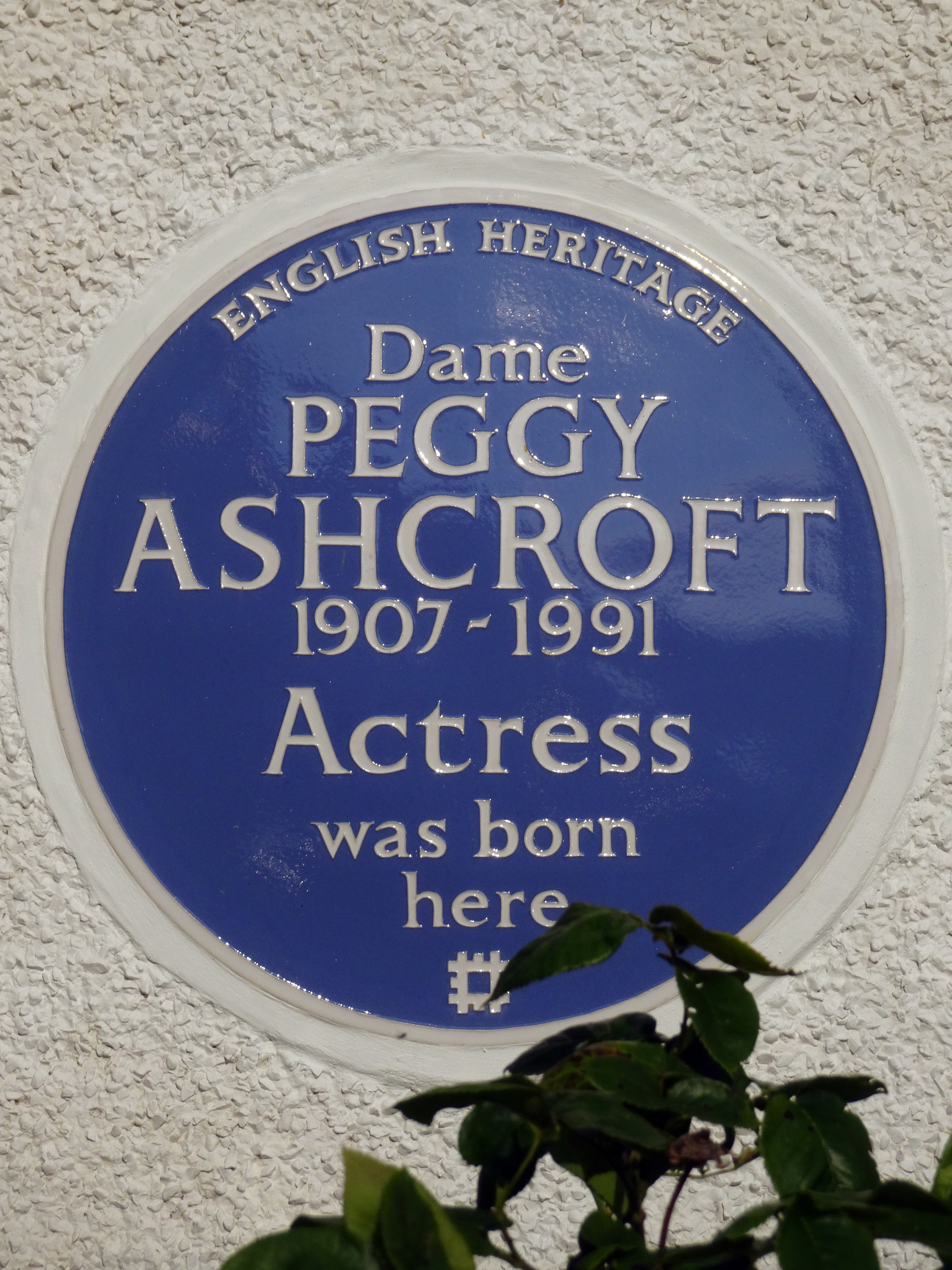
Dame Peggy Ashcroft's blue plaque in South Croydon.

Ashcroft's British state honours were Commander of the Order of the British Empire (CBE) in the 1951 Birthday Honours and Dame Commander of the Order (DBE) in the 1956 Birthday Honours. Her foreign state honours were the King's Gold Medal, Norway (1955), and the Order of St Olav, Norway (Commander, 1976). She was awarded honorary degrees by eight universities and was an honorary fellow of St Hugh's College, Oxford. She was awarded a British Film Institute Fellowship in 1989. In addition to the Oscar and BAFTA awards, she received a Laurence Olivier Award for Best Actress in a New Play for Old World in 1976, a Venice Film Festival Award for She's Been Away (1989), a BAFTA Award for the television play Caught on a Train (1980), a special award from the British Theatre Association for the television play Cream in My Coffee (1982), a special award from BAFTA (1990) and a special Laurence Olivier Award (1991).

Ashcroft is commemorated with a memorial plaque in Poets' Corner, Westminster Abbey. The Ashcroft Theatre in Croydon was named in her honour in 1962. The Royal Shakespeare Company has an Ashcroft Room directly above the Swan Theatre in Stratford-upon-Avon named after her, used for play rehearsals.

On 13 June 2024, English Heritage unveiled a blue plaque on Ashcroft's birthplace at Tirlemont Road, South Croydon.

Academy Awards

Year	Category	Nominated work	Result	Ref.
1985	Best Supporting Actress	A Passage to India	Won	

BAFTA Awards

Year	Category	Nominated work	Result	Ref.
British Academy Film Awards
1960	Best British Actress	The Nun's Story	Nominated	
1970	Best Actress in a Supporting Role	Three into Two Won't Go	Nominated	
1986	Best Actress in a Leading Role	A Passage to India	Won	
1990	Best Actress in a Supporting Role	Madame Sousatzka	Nominated	
British Academy Television Awards
1966	Best Actress	The Wars of the Roses / Theatre 625: Rosmersholm	Nominated	
1979	Best Actress	Edward & Mrs. Simpson / Hullabaloo Over Georgie and Bonnie's Pictures	Nominated	
1981	Best Actress	Cream in My Coffee / Caught on a Train	Won	
1985	Best Actress	The Jewel in the Crown	Won	
1990	Best Actress	She's Been Away	Nominated	

Emmy Awards

Year	Category	Nominated work	Result	Ref.
1985	Outstanding Lead Actress in a Limited or Anthology Series or Movie	The Jewel in the Crown	Nominated	
1989	Outstanding Supporting Actress in a Limited or Anthology Series or Movie	A Perfect Spy	Nominated	

Golden Globe Awards

Year	Category	Nominated work	Result	Ref.
1985	Best Supporting Actress – Motion Picture	A Passage to India	Won	
1985	Best Actress – Miniseries or Television Film	The Jewel in the Crown	Nominated	

Laurence Olivier Awards

Year	Category	Nominated work	Result	Ref.
1976	Actress of the Year in a New Play	Old World	Won	
1991	Society of London Theatre Special Award	—N/a	Honoured	

Other awards

Year	Awards	Category	Nominated work	Result	Ref.
1984	Boston Society of Film Critics	Best Supporting Actress	A Passage to India	Won	
1984	Los Angeles Film Critics Association	Best Supporting Actress	A Passage to India	Won	
1985	National Board of Review	Best Actress	A Passage to India	Won	
1985	New York Film Critics Circle	Best Actress	A Passage to India	Won	
1989	Venice Film Festival	Volpi Cup for Best Actress	She's Been Away	Won	

== Filmography & Sound Recordings ==
=== Film ===
Year	Title	Role	Notes
1933	The Wandering Jew	Olalla Quintana	
1935	The 39 Steps	Margaret, the crofter's wife	
1936	Rhodes of Africa	Ann Carpenter	Released in the U.S. as Rhodes, the Empire Builder
1940	Channel Incident	She	Short
1941	Quiet Wedding	Flower Lisle	
1942	We Serve	Ann	Short
1959	The Nun's Story	Mother Mathilde	
1968	Secret Ceremony	Hannah	
1969	Three Into Two Won't Go	Belle	
1971	Sunday Bloody Sunday	Mrs Greville	
1973	The Pedestrian (German: Der Fußgänger)	Lady Gray	
1976	Landscape	Beth	
1977	Joseph Andrews	Lady Tattle	
1984	A Passage to India	Mrs Moore	
1986	When the Wind Blows	Hilda Bloggs	Voice
1988	Madame Sousatzka	Lady Emily	

=== Television ===
Year	Title	Role	Notes
1939	The Tempest	Miranda	The Tempest, The Tempest/II TV Films
1939	Twelfth Night	Viola	
1959	BBC Sunday-Night Theatre	Julia Rajk	Episode: Shadow of Heroes
1962	The Cherry Orchard	Mme. Lyubov Andreyeyna Ranevsky	
1965	Theatre 625	Rebecca West	Episode: Rosmersholm
1965	The Wars of the Roses	Margaret of Anjou	
1966	ITV Play of the Week	Mrs. Patrick Campbell	Episode: Dear Liar
1967	The Wednesday Play: Days in the Trees	The Mother	Guest Star
1968	From Chekhov with Love	Olga Knipper	TV film
1972	ITV Sunday Night Theatre	Sonya	Episode: The Last Journey
1976	Arena	Winnie	Episode: Theatre, TV Series Documentary
1978	Hullabaloo Over Georgie and Bonnie's Pictures	Lady G	
1978	Edward & Mrs. Simpson	Queen Mary	
1980	Caught on a Train	Frau Messner	
1980	Cream in My Coffee	Jean Wilsher	
1980	BBC2 Playhouse		
1982	Play of the Month: Little Eyolf	The Rat Wife	
1984	The Jewel in the Crown	Barbie Batchelor	
1987	A Perfect Spy	Miss Dubber	
1989	The Heat of the Day	Nettie	TV film
1989	Screen One: She's Been Away	Lillian Huckle	Venice Film Festival – Golden Ciak Award for Best Actress; Venice Film Festival – Pasinetti Award for Best Actress
1990	Murder by the Book	Agatha Christie	

=== Radio ===
- Romeo and Juliet (BBC Light Programme 1954)
- The Duchess of Malfi BBC Third Programme (1954)
- Henrik Ibsen's Hedda Gabbler (BBC HS 1957)
- Macbeth BBC Third Programme (1966)
- Noël Coward's Hay Fever (BBC R4 1971)
- Family Voices BBC Radio 3 (1981)
- Chances BBC Radio 3 (1981)
- Anthony Minghella's A Little Like Drowning (BBC R4 1989-03-20)
- In the Native State BBC Radio 3 (1991)

=== Sound recordings ===
- Much Ado about Nothing (with John Gielgud) (Marlowe Dramatic Society)
- The Winter's Tale (with John Gielgud) (Caedmon Records)
- The Taming of the Shrew (Marlowe Dramatic Society)
- The Merchant of Venice (abridged) (Living Shakespeare)
- The Wife of Bath's Tale (Caedmon Records)
- The Rape of the Lock (Argo)
- The Shaw-Terry Letters (with Cyril Cusack) (Caedmon Records)
- The World of Peggy Ashcroft and John Gielgud (includes excerpts from Much Ado about Nothing, Richard II, Henry V, 3 Henry VI, Othello, King Lear, The Tempest and Shakespeare's sonnets) (Argo)
- Two recordings of Edith Sitwell and William Walton's Façade - with Paul Scofield conducted by Walton for Argo, and with Jeremy Irons conducted by Riccardo Chailly for Decca

== Notes, references and sources ==
=== Sources ===
- Boyle, Sheila Tully; Bunie, Andrew (1 October 2005). Paul Robeson: The Years of Promise and Achievement. University of Massachusetts Press. ISBN 978-1558495050.
- Croall, Jonathan (2000). Gielgud – A Theatrical Life, 1904–2000. London: Methuen. ISBN 0413745600.
- Donnelley, Paul (2003). Fade to Black: A Book of Movie Obituaries. Music Sales Group. ISBN 0711995125.
- Duberman, Martin B. (1989). Paul Robeson. Bodley Head. ISBN 978-0370305752.
- Gaye, Freda, ed. (1967). Who's Who in the Theatre (fourteenth ed.). London: Sir Isaac Pitman and Sons. OCLC 5997224.
- Gilbert, Susie (2009). Opera for Everybody. London: Faber and Faber. ISBN 978-0-571-22493-7.
- Gilliam, Dorothy Butler (1978). Paul Robeson: All-American. New Republic Book Company.
- Lyttelton, George; Rupert Hart-Davis (1978). Lyttelton/Hart-Davis Letters, Volume 1. London: John Murray. ISBN 071953478X.
- Miller, John (1995). Ralph Richardson – The Authorized Biography. London: Sidgwick and Jackson. ISBN 0283062371.
- Morley, Sheridan (2001). John G – The Authorised Biography of John Gielgud. London: Hodder and Stoughton. ISBN 0340368039.
- Robeson, Paul Jr. (9 July 2001). The Undiscovered Paul Robeson, An Artist's Journey, 1898–1939. John Wiley & Sons. ISBN 978-0471151050.
- Ziegler, Philip (2004). Rupert Hart-Davis: Man of Letters. London: Chatto & Windus. ISBN 0701173203.

== See also ==
- List of Academy Award winners and nominees from Great Britain
- List of Golden Globe winners
- List of Royal National Theatre Company actors
- List of actors in Royal Shakespeare Company productions
- List of Primetime Emmy Award winners
