= In the Native State =

Play by Sir Tom Stoppard

In the Native State is a radio play by Tom Stoppard. First broadcast by the BBC in 1991, it was later adapted by Stoppard into the stage play Indian Ink.

The production was first broadcast on BBC Radio Three on 20 April 1991. It was directed by John Tydeman and starred Felicity Kendal and Peggy Ashcroft. It was Dame Peggy’s last dramatic performance. Saeed Jaffrey played the role of the Rajah.

The original production was broadcast again after the death of John Tydeman in 2020, preceded by a tribute from Tom Stoppard.

== Plot ==
The play takes place in two times: "today" and 1930, the year of Gandhi’s Salt March.

Flora Crewe (Felicity Kendal), a young poet with a somewhat scandalous reputation, travels to India for her health, where she delivers a series of lectures on British literary society. She meets an Indian painter, Nirad Das, and agrees to sit for a portrait.

Meanwhile, in contemporary England, another young Indian painter, Anish, the son of Nirad, visits Mrs Eleanor Swan (Peggy Ashcroft), the sister of Flora Crewe. Eleanor spent much of her life in India before independence, and is deeply attached to it. She and Anish clash over interpretation of Indian history and untangle the relationship of Flora and Nirad.

The title contains a pun on ”native“, meaning one of the states of India with its own ruler, or ”nudity“. The original portrait, used on a book cover, was never completed. However, a second, nude portrait by Nirad Das of Flora was discovered after their deaths: the artist had pointedly, and with great discretion, left it to his son. Although unauthorized, Flora had suggested the work, and enthusiastically approved the result.

It was recognizing the figure, and his father’s distinctive style, in the book jacket’s image that caused Anish to identify the naked white woman. Eleanor was shown the second portrait, and was much moved by the vulnerability it showed in her dying sister. Flora died, in India, of something characteristic of tuberculosis.

== Editions ==
- In the Native State. London: Faber, 1991 ISBN 0-571-16474-9
- Tom Stoppard Radio Plays, (CD) London: British Library, 2012 ISBN 978-0712351232
  - Review at the British Universities Film & Video Council
