= Ivan Kyncl =

Czech-British photographer (1953–2004)

Ivan Kyncl (15 April 1953 – 6 October 2004) was a Czech-British theatre photographer. After fleeing his native Czechoslovakia in 1980, he became a British citizen and worked as the Royal Shakespeare Company's house photographer as well as in numerous other theatres in the United Kingdom until his death in 2004.

== Early life ==
Kyncl was born in Prague on 15 April 1953. He was not allowed to enter university on account of his father being imprisoned, subsequently becoming a professional photographer and taking photos of political prisoners and dissidents in Czechoslovakia. His photography involved shooting on location at prisons and courts, and using hidden cameras for close objects, as well as telephoto lenses for things he could not approach. He left his home country in 1980.

== Move to the United Kingdom ==
In 1980 Kyncl was granted asylum in the United Kingdom, before becoming the Royal Shakespeare Company's house photographer in the 1980s. He also worked for the Royal Court Theatre, the Almeida Theatre, and the Royal National Theatre. In his lifetime he gained British citizenship.

== Personal life ==
His parents were Jiřina Kynclová, who survived him, and writer Karel Kyncl, a Charter 77 signatory, who died in 1997. Kyncl died in 2004 at the age of 51 due to heart failure. He was survived by his wife of 23 years, Alena.

== Legacy ==
In 2007, the first Czech exhibition solely of Kyncl's work was held in Prague. Czech Television broadcast a documentary about Kyncl's life in 2017, titled Mistr objektivu - Ivan Kyncl. In 2019 his work went on display for four months at London's Victoria and Albert Museum in an exhibition entitled Ivan Kyncl: In the Minute.
