= The Collection (play) =

1961 play by Harold Pinter

The Collection is a 1961 play by Harold Pinter featuring two couples, James and Stella and Harry and Bill. It is a comedy laced with typically "Pinteresque" ambiguity and "implications of threat and strong feeling produced through colloquial language, apparent triviality, and long pauses" (Oxford English Dictionary).

== Setting ==
The Collection takes place on a divided stage, shared by a house in London's Belgravia, and a flat in Chelsea, with another space between them where telephone calls take place; according to Pinter's stage description, the "three areas" comprise "two peninsulas and a promontory" (Three Plays [43]).

Bill, a dress designer in his twenties, lives with Harry, a man in his forties, in Harry's house, in Belgravia, which has "Elegant decor" (Three Plays [43]). Stella, another dress designer, in her thirties like her husband and business partner James, lives with him in "James' flat" in Chelsea, which has "Tasteful contemporary furnishing." According to Pinter's stage description, whereas the set for Harry's house ("Stage left") "comprises the living-room, hall, front door and staircase to the first floor," with a "Kitchen exit below staircase," the set for James's flat in Chelsea ("Stage right") "comprises the living-room only," while "Off stage right" there are "other rooms and front door" and "Up stage centre on promontory [a] telephone box," where the phone calls are made (Three Plays [43]).

== Plot synopsis ==
One evening while at home Harry (Kane) and Bill (Lloyd), a dress designer, receive an unsettling anonymous phone call, which is to be followed by a further unsettling visit from a man who will refuse to leave his name. Following some apparently trivial conversation between Stella, another dress designer, and James (Horne), her husband and business partner, that occurs in his flat, James has left it to call on Bill at Harry's house, revealing that he was the anonymous caller and is the unexpected visitor. James confronts Bill with the confession of his wife Stella that she has had a one-night affair with Bill in her hotel room. Bill first claims that she invented the story. He later admits to their having "kissed a bit", but insists he never went to Stella's room. He further renders that version ambiguous when James remembers calling Stella in her hotel room:

JAMES: [...] Then I phoned.
Pause.
I spoke to her. [...] You were sitting on the bed, next to her.

BILL: Not sitting. Lying.

James's obsession to meet the man who has purportedly cuckolded him––suggesting archetypal symbolic significance in Pinter's choice of his surname (Horne)–– and to confront him with "the truth" culminates in a "mock duel" with household knives, in which Bill is scarred. Harry then intervenes and relates to James Stella's alleged admission that she has invented the whole story and the two never really met (in fact, what she has told him is that James was the one who "dreamed it up"). Bill confirms that nothing happened, and Harry viciously chastises him, calling him a "slum slug" with a "slum mind" and claiming that he "confirms stupid sordid little stories just to amuse himself, while everyone else has to run round in circles to get to the root of the matter and smooth the whole thing out". As James is about to leave, Bill suddenly changes his story for the last time and tells James: "we sat ... in the lounge, on a sofa for two hours ... talked we talked about it ... we didn't move from the lounge never went to her room ... just talked about what we would do ... if we did get to her room two hours ... we never touched ... we just talked about it." James then goes back home and confronts his wife with this final version of "the truth"––

You didn't do anything, did you?
Pause.
That's the truth, isn't it?
Pause.
You just sat and talked about what you would do, if you went to your room. That's what you did.
Pause.
Didn't you?
Pause.

That's the truth . . . isn't it?"––

Stella never responds.

== Characters ==
- Harry, a man in his forties
- James, a man in his thirties
- Stella, a woman in her thirties
- Bill, a man in his late twenties

== Production history ==
- First presented by the Royal Shakespeare Company, Aldwych Theatre, London, 18 June 1962
  - Harry – Michael Hordern
  - James – Kenneth Haigh
  - Stella – Barbara Murray
  - Bill – John Ronane
- Laurence Olivier Presents (Granada Television, 1976)
  - Harry – Laurence Olivier
  - James – Alan Bates
  - Stella – Helen Mirren
  - Bill – Malcolm McDowell
- Donmar Warehouse June 1998
  - Harry – Harold Pinter
  - James – Douglas Hodge
  - Stella – Lia Williams
  - Bill – Colin McFarlane
- Comedy Theatre, London, January/February 2008
  - Harry – Timothy West
  - James – Richard Coyle
  - Stella – Gina McKee
  - Bill – Charlie Cox
- Harold Pinter Theatre, London, September/October 2018
  - Harry – David Suchet
  - James – John Macmillan
  - Stella – Hayley Squires
  - Bill – Russell Tovey
- Manuel Artime Theater, Miami, March 2025
  - Harry – Jose Luis Perez
  - James – Rodrigo Jerez
  - Stella – Vanessa Tamayo
  - Bill – Eric Becerra
