= Trouble in the Works =

1959 comedy sketch by Harold Pinter

Trouble in the Works (1959) is a comedy sketch by Harold Pinter. The sketch has two characters, Mr. Fibbs and Wills. The play takes place in an office, where Wills has been called into Mr. Fibbs' office to tell him why the workers are unhappy. According to Mr. Fibbs, his workers are treated very well and he can't seem to understand why his workers are so unhappy. Wills explains to him that though the workers are treated well, they have turned against the products that they make. The majority of the rest of the show is the two going back and forth on which products the workers no longer like. At the end, Mr. Fibbs asks what the workers would rather make, and Wills answers, "Brandy balls".

== History ==
Trouble in the Works was one of Harold Pinter's earlier works, written in 1959. This is one of a series of short sketch comedy, Sean Foley said, "These are classic comedy sketches, some of them written for revues and cabaret nights, and there's this strain of surrealism...he got there 12 years before Monty Python," (Merritt). Trouble in the Works was written with five other sketches, known as the Revue Sketches. Many of the poems that Pinter wrote that were in more of a dialogue form turned were turned into revue sketches.

From when it was first seen in 1959, not much of this play has been changed. There is one notable change that has been made in many productions, which is the changing of the last line from, "Brandy balls" to "Trouble".

== Theatre theories ==
Materialist Theory: This theory is arguably one of the most prevalent theories within the play. Materialist Theory is described as individuals are understood and defined by the products they create; though the workers are defined by the products they make, they have no claim to those products. This is clearly seen in the play as the workers are no longer able to connect with their products. Even though they are treated extremely well by the company, the workers are no longer happy, and this has negatively affected their work and production. Mr. Fibbs claims that several of the products as his own, and given that he is upper management, it would explain the disconnect between the workers and the products.

Reader-Response and Reception Theory Reader-Response and Reception Theory can be defined by how the audience takes what they see or read from a production or play, regardless of the author's original intentions. Pinter wrote with no audience in mind, but merely saw a situation and later wrote about it. Pinter was surprised by how much meaning people extract from his work, when he saw it as very straightforward. Given the different backgrounds, audience members or readers could all take away their own different messages from the play; for example, a working class person may side with the workers in the play, and their hatred of the products, but someone in a higher socioeconomic status might see that the workers are given these great benefits and they are just causing trouble.

Post Modern Theory: Though Pinter is often described within Modernism, there are points of Post Modern Theory that can be applied to Trouble in the Works. One of the points of Post Modernist Theory is a reaction to modernism, which has a focus on the individual, while post modernism recognizes the difficulty of everyone being individuals when there are so many people. In the play, the workers push back against the products to which they don't have claim, and demand something they can get behind. Though they are asserting themselves as individuals, they are doing it as a collective.

== Original production ==
The sketch was originally performed on stage in the West End revue One to Another in July 1959.

== National Theatre ==
The Royal National Theatre staged the piece as part of an evening of Pinter's Sketches, on 8 February 2002.

Cast

- Corin Redgrave as Fibbs
- Patrick Marber as Wills

Critical reception

In The Guardian, Michael Billington wrote "Much the funniest is Trouble in the Works in which Patrick Marber's obdurate foreman achieves ascendancy over Corin Redgrave's quivering employer by his linguistic expertise in naming mechanical parts: by the end Marber is smugly behind the boss's desk having achieved a classic Pinter power-reversal."

== Pinter's People ==
The sketch, along with 13 others by Pinter, was performed as part of Pinter's People, which opened on 30 January 2007, at London's Haymarket Theatre.
