= Characteristics of Harold Pinter's work =

Aspects of the work of British playwright Harold Pinter (1930–2008)

Characteristics of Harold Pinter's work identifies distinctive aspects of the works of the British playwright Harold Pinter (1930–2008) and gives an indication of their influence on Anglo-American culture.

== Characteristics of Pinter's work ==
=== Pinteresque ===
"That Harold Pinter occupies a position as a modern classic is illustrated by his name entering the language as an adjective used to describe a particular atmosphere and environment in drama: 'Pinteresque' "– placing him in the company of authors considered unique or influential enough to elicit eponymous adjectives. Susan Harris Smith observes:

The term "Pinteresque" has had an established place in the English language for almost thirty years. The OED defines it as "of or relating to the British playwright, Harold Pinter, or his works"; thus, like a snake swallowing its own tail the definition forms the impenetrable logic of a closed circle and begs the tricky question [sic] of what the word specifically means.

The Online OED (2006) defines Pinteresque more explicitly: "Resembling or characteristic of his plays. ... Pinter's plays are typically characterized by implications of threat and strong feeling produced through colloquial language, apparent triviality, and long pauses." The Swedish Academy defines characteristics of the Pinteresque in greater detail:

Pinter restored theatre to its basic elements: an enclosed space and unpredictable dialogue, where people are at the mercy of each other and pretence crumbles. With a minimum of plot, drama emerges from the power struggle and hide-and-seek of interlocution. Pinter's drama was first perceived as a variation of absurd theatre, but has later more aptly been characterised as 'comedy of menace', a genre where the writer allows us to eavesdrop on the play of domination and submission hidden in the most mundane of conversations. In a typical Pinter play, we meet people defending themselves against intrusion or their own impulses by entrenching themselves in a reduced and controlled existence. Another principal theme is the volatility and elusiveness of the past.

Over the years Pinter himself has "always been very dismissive when people have talked about languages and silences and situations as being 'Pinteresque'," observes Kirsty Wark in their interview on Newsnight Review broadcast on 23 June 2006; she wonders, "Will you finally acknowledge there is such a thing as a 'Pinteresque' moment?" "No," Pinter replies, "I've no idea what it means. Never have. I really don't.... I can detect where a thing is 'Kafkaesque' or 'Chekhovian' [Wark's examples]," but with respect to the "Pinteresque", he says, "I can't define what it is myself. You use the term 'menace' and so on. I have no explanation of any of that really. What I write is what I write."

=== Comedy of menace ===
Once asked what his plays are about, Pinter lobbed back a phrase "the weasel under the cocktail cabinet", which he regrets has been taken seriously and applied in popular criticism:

Once many years ago, I found myself engaged uneasily in a public discussion on theatre. Someone asked me what was my work 'about'. I replied with no thought at all and merely to frustrate this line of enquiry: 'the weasel under the cocktail cabinet'. This was a great mistake. Over the years I have seen that remark quoted in a number of learned columns. It has now seemingly acquired a profound significance, and is seen to be a highly relevant and meaningful observation about my own work. But for me the remark meant precisely nothing.

Despite Pinter's protestations to the contrary, many reviewers and other critics consider the remark, though facetious, an apt description of his plays. For although Pinter repudiated it, it does contain an important clue about his relationship to English dramatic tradition (Sofer 29); "Mr. Pinter ... is celebrated for what the critic Irving Wardle has called 'the comedy of menace' " (Brantley, "Harold Pinter"; cf. "A Master of Menace" [multimedia presentation]).

In December 1971, in his interview with Pinter about Old Times, Mel Gussow recalled that "After The Homecoming [Pinter] said that [he] 'couldn't any longer stay in the room with this bunch of people who opened doors and came in and went out. Landscape and Silence [the two short poetic memory plays that were written between The Homecoming and Old Times] are in a very different form. There isn't any menace at all.' " Later, when he asked Pinter to expand on his view that he had "tired" of "menace", Pinter added: "when I said that I was tired of menace, I was using a word that I didn't coin. I never thought of menace myself. It was called 'comedy of menace' quite a long time ago. I never stuck categories on myself, or on any of us [playwrights]. But if what I understand the word menace to mean is certain elements that I have employed in the past in the shape of a particular play, then I don't think it's worthy of much more exploration."

=== Two silences ===
==== The "Pinter Silence" ====
Among the most-commonly cited of Pinter's comments on his own work are his remarks about two kinds of silence ("two silences"), including his objections to "that tired, grimy phrase 'failure of communication'," as defined in his speech to the National Student Drama Festival in Bristol in 1962, incorporated in his published version of the speech entitled "Writing for the Theatre":

There are two silences. One when no word is spoken. The other when perhaps a torrent of language is being employed. This speech is speaking of a language locked beneath it. That is its continual reference. The speech we hear is an indication of that which we don't hear. It is a necessary avoidance, a violent, sly, anguished or mocking smoke screen which keeps the other in its place. When true silence falls we are still left with echo but are nearer nakedness. One way of looking at speech is to say that it is a constant stratagem to cover nakedness.

We have heard many times that tired, grimy phrase: 'failure of communication' ... and this phrase has been fixed to my work quite consistently. I believe the contrary. I think that we communicate only too well, in our silence, in what is unsaid, and that what takes place is a continual evasion, desperate rearguard attempts to keep ourselves to ourselves. Communication is too alarming. To enter into someone else's life is too frightening. To disclose to others the poverty within us is too fearsome a possibility.

I am not suggesting that no character in a play can never say what he in fact means. Not at all. I have found that there invariably does come a moment when this happens, when he says something, perhaps, which he has never said before. And where this happens, what he says is irrevocable, and can never be taken back.

In his "Presentation Speech" of the 2005 Nobel Prize in Literature to Harold Pinter, in absentia, Swedish writer Per Wästberg, Member of the Swedish Academy and Chairman of its Nobel Committee, observes: "The abyss under chat, the unwillingness to communicate other than superficially, the need to rule and mislead, the suffocating sensation of accidents bubbling under the quotidian, the nervous perception that a dangerous story has been censored – all this vibrates through Pinter's drama."

==== The "Pinter Pause" ====
One of the "two silences"–when Pinter's stage directions indicate pause and silence when his characters are not speaking at all–has become a "trademark" of Pinter's dialogue called the "Pinter pause": "During the 1960s, Pinter became famous–nay, notorious–for his trademark: 'The Pinter pause' " (Filichia). Actors and directors often find Pinter's "pauses and silences" to be daunting elements of performing his plays, leading to much discussion of them in theatrical and dramatic criticism, and actors who have worked with Pinter in rehearsals have "reported that he regretted ever starting to write 'Pause' as a stage direction, because it often leads to portentous overacting" (Jacobson). Speaking about their experiences of working with Pinter in rehearsing director Carey Perloff's 1989 double bill of The Birthday Party and Mountain Language (for Classic Stage Company), American actors David Strathairn and Peter Riegert agreed with Jean Stapleton that "Pinter's comments ... 'freed' the cast from feeling reverential about his pauses," and, while Strathairn "believes pauses can be overdone," he also "thinks Pinter's are distinctive: 'The natural ones always seem to be right where he wrote them. His pause or beat comes naturally in the rhythm of the conversation. [As an actor, you] find yourself pausing in mid-sentence, thinking about what you just said or are going to say....' " Perloff said: "He didn't want them weighted that much. ... He kept laughing that everybody made such a big deal about it.' He wanted them honored, she said, but not as 'these long, heavy, psychological pauses, where people look at each other filled with pregnant meaning' " (Jacobson).

More recently, in an article elliptically headlined "Cut the Pauses ... Says Pinter", a London Sunday Times television program announcement for Harry Burton's documentary film Working With Pinter, Olivia Cole observes that he "made brooding silence into an art form, but after 50 years Harold Pinter has said directors should be free to cut his trademark pauses if they want...." In Working With Pinter (shown on British television's More 4 in February 2007), Cole writes, Pinter "says he has been misunderstood. He maintains that while others detected disturbing undertones, he merely intended basic stage directions" in writing "pause" and "silence". She quotes Pinter's remarks from Working With Pinter:

These damn silences and pauses are all to do with what's going on ... and if they don't make any sense, then I always say cut them. I think they've been taken much too far these silences and pauses in my plays. I've really been extremely depressed when I've seen productions in which a silence happens because it says silence or a pause happens because it says pause. And it's totally artificial and meaningless.

When I myself act in my own plays, which I have occasionally, I've cut half of them, actually.

Exemplifying the frequency and relative duration of pauses in Pinter's plays, Cole observes that "Pinter wrote 140 pauses into his work Betrayal, 149 into The Caretaker and 224 into The Homecoming. The longest are typically 10 seconds."

Pinter's having encouraged actors to "cut" his pauses and silences–with the important qualification "if they don't make any sense" (elided in Cole's headline)–has "bemused directors", according to Cole, who quotes Pinter's longtime friend and director Sir Peter Hall as saying "that it would be a 'failure' for a director or actor to ignore the pauses":

A pause in Pinter is as important as a line. They are all there for a reason. Three dots is a hesitation, a pause is a fairly mundane crisis and a silence is some sort of crisis.

Beckett started it and Harold took it over to express that which is inexpressible in a very original and particular way, and made them something which is his....

Cole concludes that Hall added, however, that, in Working With Pinter, Pinter "was right to criticise productions in which actors were fetishising their pauses".

Quoting J. Barry Lewis, the director of a recent production of Betrayal, by Palm Beach Dramaworks, Lisa Cohen observes that Pinter has "even entered popular culture with what is called 'the Pinter pause,' a term that describes ... those silent moments 'filled with unspoken dialogue' that occur throughout his plays."

== Some examples of Pinter's influence on Anglo-American popular culture ==
Allusions to "the Pinteresque" and to specific characteristics of Pinter's works and, more recently, to his politics pervade Anglo-American popular culture (OED; Susan Harris Smith; mass media accounts, as cited above). The Modern Language Association annual convention has already hosted two linked programs on "Pinter's Influence and Influences" and hosted another one relating to this subject in 2007 (Merritt, "Harold Pinter Bibliography: 2000–2002"; "Pinter Society Events", Harold Pinter Society website).

Exemplifying Pinter's cultural influence for several decades, a line in "The Ladies Who Lunch", a song in Company, the 1970 Broadway musical by George Furth and Stephen Sondheim, alludes to Manhattanite "ladies who lunch" taking in "a Pinter play", "fashionable" at that time (Merritt, Pinter in Play 217). Yet Pinter told John Barber ten years later, in 1980: "'This really is an awful business, this fashion. I must tell you I feel I've been unfashionable all my life. I was oldfashioned from the very beginning, and I'm unfashionable now, really.' "

Episode 164 of the very popular American television series Seinfeld, entitled "The Betrayal" (originally broadcast 27 November 1997), is structured in reverse somewhat like Pinter's play and film Betrayal. Jerry Seinfeld's comic parodic homage to Harold Pinter, the episode features a character named "Pinter". Since the first airing of that Seinfeld episode and since the subsequent release of films like Memento and other popular works with reversed chronological structures, some media accounts (such as that in the IMDb) refer to Pinter's plot device in his play and film as a mere "gimmick". But scholars and other critical reviewers consider the reversed structure a fully integrated ingenious stylistic means of heightening multiple kinds of ironies energising Betrayal's comedic wit, its cumulative poignancy, and its ultimate emotional impact on audiences, and the play has been produced throughout the United States, Britain, and parts of the rest of the world with increasing frequency.

A character in the fourth episode of the second season of Dawson's Creek, "Tamara's Return" (28 Oct 1998), alludes to Pinter's so-called "sub-textual" use of silence as "a classic 'Pinter' moment". In dialogue between lead character Pacey Witter (played by Joshua Jackson) and Tamara Jacobs (Leann Hunley), his former English teacher with whom Pacey has had an affair, Tamara tells Pacey that an awkward moment of silence between them is "what we ex-English teachers call a classic 'Pinter' moment, where everything is said in silence because the emotion behind what we really want to say is just too overwhelming. ... silence is an acquired taste. The more complicated life becomes the better it is to learn to say nothing." When Pacey inquires "Who is this Pinter guy?" Tamara urges him, "Stay in school." Later Pacey tells Tamara that he has "looked up this Pinter guy. Harold, playwright, the king of subtext. You say one thing, but you mean another," wondering further: "Do you think it's possible for us to have a moment without all the subtext?" "Uh, I don't know, Pacey," Tamara replies. "Words have always gotten us into so much trouble." Pacey and Tamara finally agree that "This Pinter guy was really onto something."

Further alluding to Pinter's renowned "pauses and silences", the song "Up Against It", from the album Bilingual, by the English electronic music/pop music duo Pet Shop Boys, includes the lines: "Such a cold winter/With scenes as slow as Pinter" (Tennant and Lowe).

Also illustrating the frequent allusions to Pinter's "silences" in commentaries about others' work, in a book review of Nick Hornby's "debut teenage novel" Slam (Penguin Books), Janet Christie observes hyperbolically that Hornby is "spot-on with the way a conversation with a teenage boy contains more meaningful silences than Harold Pinter's entire oeuvre ...."

== Works cited ==
Christie, Janet. "Cautionary Tale about a Boy and Girl". Scotland on Sunday, Books. Scotsman Publications, 7 October 2007. Web. 9 October 2007. [Outdated link.] (archived version). Internet Archive, 13 October 2007. Web. 2 June 2009.

Dorfman, Ariel. "The World That Harold Pinter Unlocked". Washington Post. Washington Post, 27 December 2008, A15. Print. The Washington Post Company, 27 December 2008. Web. 9 January 2009.

Dorfman, Ariel. " 'You want to free the world from oppression?' ". New Statesman, Jan. 2009. New Statesman, 8 January 2009. World Wide Web. 9 January 2009. ("Ariel Dorfman on the life and work of Harold Pinter [1930–2008].")

Edgar, David. "Pinter's Weasels". Guardian, "Comment is Free". Guardian Media Group, 29 December 2008. Web. 23 March 2009. ("The idea that he was a dissenting figure only in later life ignores the politics of his early work.")

"Editorial: Harold Pinter: Breaking the Rules". Guardian.co.uk. Guardian Media Group, 27 December 2008. Web. 7 March 2009. ("Pinter broke the rules in art and in life.")

Tamara's Return (1998) at IMDb. Episode 4 of Season 2 (204). Dawson's Creek: The Complete Second Season. DVD. Sony Pictures, (released) 16 December 2003. Web. 2 October 2007.

Tennant, Neil, and Chris Lowe (The Pet Shop Boys). "Up Against It". Song lyrics. petshopboys.co.uk: The Official Site. 2 October 2007. ["Browse all lyrics alphabetically" accessible via "Lyric of the day: Read more". Requires Adobe Flash Player 8 or above.]
