= Precisely (sketch) =

Precisely is a dramatic sketch by the English playwright Harold Pinter.

Pinter wrote "Precisely" for The Big One, a theatrical evening arranged by the peace movement at London's Apollo Theatre, on 18 December 1983. Directed by the author, the sketch concerns two men, Stephen and Roger, who argue about the exact number of a figure, whether 20 million or more. It becomes clear that they are talking about body counts.

== Original cast ==
- Stephen - Barry Foster
- Roger - Martin Jarvis
