= Night School (play) =

1960 television play by Harold Pinter

Night School is a play by Harold Pinter presented on television in 1960. It was first published in 1961. The plot focuses on a man returning home from prison to find his room being rented out to a tenant. As customary with most of Pinter's works, the play features many aspects of Comedy of menace.

== Original production ==
Associated-Rediffusion broadcast the play on 21 July 1960, in a production by Joan Kemp-Welch, for the ITV Television Playhouse series.

Cast

- Sally - Vivien Merchant
- Walter - Milo O'Shea
- Solto - Martin Miller
- Under Manager - Nicholas Stuart
- Manager - Bernard Spear
- Annie - Jane Eccles
- Milly - Iris Vandeleur
- Hostess - Mavis Traill
- Cast member - Barbara Ferris
- Cast member- Carol Austin

== Radio adaptation ==
The BBC Third Programme broadcast the play on 25 September 1966, in a production by Guy Vaesen.

Cast (in order of speaking)

- Annie - Mary O'Farrell
- Walter - John Hollis
- Milly - Sylvia Coleridge
- Sally - Prunella Scales
- Solto - Sydney Tafler
- Tully - Preston Lockwood
- Barbara - Barbara Mitchell
- Mavis - Carol Marsh
