= Applicant (sketch) =

Sketch written by Harold Pinter

Applicant is a dramatic sketch written by Harold Pinter. Originally written in 1959 and first published by Eyre Methuen in 1961, it was first broadcast on BBC Radio on the Third Programme "between February and March 1964," along with Pinter's other revue sketches, That's Your Trouble, That's All, Interview, and Dialogue for Three.

A revised and much-expanded version of Applicant is incorporated in the last scene of Act One of Pinter's play The Hothouse, wherein the character still called Lamb is "tested" in "a soundproof room" by Miss Cutts, the successor of Miss Piffs, and her colleague Gibbs (58–78).

According to Pinter's official authorised biographer Michael Billington, the sketch (and the scene in The Hothouse) was inspired by and reproduced details of "his own experience [as 'a guinea pig']" at the Maudsley Hospital in London" in 1954, in which he took part to earn "ten bob or something" and about which he told Billington: "The Hothouse was kicked off by that experience. I was well aware of being used for an experiment and feeling quite powerless" (Harold Pinter 102, 104).

== Setting ==
An "office" (Pinter, "Applicant" 231).

== Characters ==
- Lamb, "a young man, eager, cheerful, enthusiastic"
- Miss Piffs, "the essence of efficiency" (231)

== Synopsis ==
Applying for a job, Lamb, who identifies himself in the dialogue as a "physicist" (231), is given a psychological test by Miss Piffs. She "attaches" "electrodes" and "earphones" to him and Lamb is subjected to a "piercing high pitched buzz-hum" (232). Before he has recovered, Miss Piffs bombards him with social, medical and sexual questions (232–34), in response to which he says "in a high voice", "Well, it depends what you mean really—" (234). At the climax of her interrogation she "presses the other button and the piercing buzz-hum is heard again" (234). Lamb "collapses", and "Silence" falls, as "He lies face upwards", as Miss Piffs "looks at him" and ends the sketch with "Thank you very much, Mr. Lamb. We'll let you know" (234).
