= One for the Road (Pinter play) =

1984 Harold Pinter one-act play

- Hardcover ed., Eyre Methuen Ltd, 1985 (Cover photo: Ivan Kyncl)
- Written by: Harold Pinter
- Original language: English
- Subject: Torture, rape, and murder of political prisoners; human rights
- Genre: Drama
- Setting: A room in a house in an unspecified location.

Premiere
- Date premiered: 13 March 1984
- Place premiered: The Lyric Studio, Hammersmith, London
- Official website

One for the Road is an overtly political one-act play by Harold Pinter, which premiered at Lyric Studio, Hammersmith, in London, on 13 March 1984, and was first published by Methuen in 1984.

== Background ==
One for the Road, considered Pinter's "statement about the human rights abuses of totalitarian governments", was inspired, according to Antonia Fraser, by reading on May 19, 1983, Jacobo Timerman's Prisoner Without a Name, Cell Without a Number, a book about torture on Argentina's military dictatorship; later, in January 1984, he got to write it after an argument with two Turkish girls at a family birthday party on the subject of torture.

The year following the publication, Pinter would visit Turkey with Arthur Miller "to investigate allegations of the torture and persecution of Turkish writers"; as he explains further in his interview with Nicholas Hern, "A Play and Its Politics", conducted in February 1985 and published in 1985 in the revised and reset Eyre Methuen hardback and in 1986 in the Grove Evergreen paperback and illustrated with production photographs taken at the premiere by Ivan Kyncl, torture of political prisoners in countries like Turkey "is systematic". Due to the tolerance and even support of such human rights abuses by the governments of Western countries like the United States, Pinter emphasizes (prophetically it turned out given later revelations about extraordinary rendition) in One for the Road how such abuses might happen in or at the direction of these democracies too.

In this play the actual physical violence takes place off stage; Pinter indirectly dramatizes such terror and violence through verbal and non-verbal allusions to off-stage acts of repeated rape of Gila, physical mutilation of Victor, and the ultimate murder of their son, Nicky. The effects of the violence that takes place off stage are, however, portrayed verbally and non-verbally on stage.

Though in the interview, Pinter says that he himself "always find[s] agitprop insulting and objectionable […] now, of course I'm doing the same thing". He observes that "when the play was done in New York, as the second part of a triple-bill [Other Places, directed by Alan Schneider, at the Manhattan Theatre Club (1984)], a goodly percentage of people left the theatre when it was over. They were asked why they were going and invariably they said, 'We know all about this. We don't need to be told.' Now, I believe that they were lying. They did not know about it and did not want to know".

== Setting ==
The play takes place in "A room" in a house during the course of one day ("Morning", "Afternoon", and "Night"), but the location of the room is unspecified. The furniture in the room, a "desk" and a "machine" used as a telephone intercom, and the bars on the windows, as illustrated by the premiere production photographs, suggests that the room in a domestic house has been converted into an office and that the house functions as a prison The use of some common English colloquial expressions (e.g., the titular "One for the Road" repeated by Nicolas regarding having another drink) implies that the action could take place in Great Britain or America, or another English-speaking country among "civilised" people.

== Synopsis ==
Victor and his wife Gila, who have obviously been tortured, as their "clothes" are "torn" and they are "bruised", and their seven-year-old son, Nicky, are imprisoned in separate rooms of a house by a totalitarian or democratic regime represented by an officer named Nicolas. Though in control locally—"I can do absolutely anything I like" —he is not the final arbiter of power, since he refers to outside sources to validate his actions: "Do you know the man who runs this country?"; "God speaks through me." But the play reveals that Nicolas is insecure and that he overcompensates by aggressive gestures and words, threatening both Victor and Gila with a peculiar gesture, waving and jabbing his "big finger" and his "little finger […] both at the same time" before their eyes; while he tries to converse with Victor as if they were both "civilised" men, he stresses gratuitously that "Everyone respects me here" and invents depraved fantasies of having sex with a menstruating Gila, even ruminating perversely that she has "fallen in love" with him. Pinter highlighted Nicolas' insecurities in his own performance of the role as directed by Robin Lefèvre in 2001, adding stage business at the start; as Michael Billington describes in his review of a performance at the New Ambassadors Theatre, "In a long, silent prelude we see Nicolas psyching himself up for the ensuing ritual."

When Nicolas confronts Gila, he refers to sexual torture of her that has taken and will continue to take place off stage: "Have they [my soldiers] been raping you? […] How many times? How many times have you been raped? Pause. How many times?" [...] "How many times have you been raped?"

Though Nicolas chats in an ostensibly-innocuous manner with Victor's and Gila's seven-year-old son Nicky about whether the child "Would like to be a soldier" when he grows up, he bullies even the little boy: "You like soldiers. Good. But you spat at my soldiers and you kicked them. You attacked them." After Nicky says, "I didn't like those soldiers", Nicolas replies menacingly: "They don't like you either, my darling."

Victor's and Gila's specific "offences" (if there are any) go unnamed. Nicolas accuses Gila of mentioning her father when she responds to a question about where she met her husband by saying that she met him in "a room", in her "father's room"; Nicolas exaggerates this mere mention as if she were "to defame, to debase, the memory of [her dead] father"—"a wonderful man […] a man of honour" whom he claims to have "loved […] as if he were my own father".

In his final exchange with Victor, Nicolas' use of the past tense signifies that the soldiers have killed Nicky and portends his parents' similarly terrifying fate at their hands: "Your son. I wouldn't worry about him. He was a little prick" (italics added), leading to Pinter's final stage directions, as Victor "straightens and stares at" Nicolas, followed by "Silence" and "Blackout."

== Characters ==
- Nicolas Mid 40s
- Gila 30
- Victor 30
- Nicky 7

== Notable productions ==
The Grove Press edition of the play lists eight foreign countries where the play had been staged by the time it went to press in 1985, with a list of 10 additional countries in which future productions were being planned. Pinter's official website features a calendar of later productions, and the page devoted to One for the Road provides some hyperlinked foreign productions.

=== Premiere: The Lyric Studio, Hammersmith – 1984 (13 March 1984) ===
Part of a double bill with Victoria Station. Cast:

- Alan Bates (Nicolas)
- Roger Lloyd-Pack (Victor)
- Jenny Quayle (Gila)
- Stephen Kember or Felix Yates (Nicky)

Production team:

- Harold Pinter, Director
- Tim Bickerton, Designer
- Dave Horn, Lighting

=== American premiere: Other Places, Manhattan Theatre Club, New York City, April 1984 ===
Part of triple bill with Victoria Station and A Kind of Alaska. Cast:

- Kevin Conway (Nicolas)
- Greg Martin (Victor)
- David George Polyak (Nicky)
- Caroline Lagerfelt (Gila)

Production team:

- Alan Schneider, Director
- John Lee Beatty, Set design
- Jess Goldstein, Costume design
- Rocky Greenberg, Lighting design
- Lynne Meadow, Artistic director
- Barry Grove, Managing director

=== BBC-TV production, transmitted on 25 July 1985 ===
Same cast as London premiere, except that Gila was played by Rosie Kerslake and Nicky by Paul Adams. Kenneth Ives directed.

=== In triple bill Other Places, Duchess Theatre, London, 7 March – 22 June 1985 ===
Also directed by Kenneth Ives. Cast:

- Colin Blakely (Nicolas)
- Roger Davidson (Victor)
- Rosie Kerslake (Gila)
- Daniel Kipling or Simon Vyvyan (Nicky)

=== Gate Theatre, Dublin / Lincoln Center Harold Pinter Festival – Summer 2001 ===
Cast:

- Harold Pinter (Nicolas)
- Lloyd Hutchinson (Victor)
- Indira Varma (Gila)
- Rory Copus (Nicky)

Production team:

- Robin Lefèvre, Director
- Liz Ashcroft, Set & Costume Design
- Mick Hughes, Sound Design

=== In double bill with Party Time, BAC, London, 2003 ===
Cast:

- Jason Barnett (Victor)
- Kristin Hutchinson (Gila)
- Colin McCormack (Nicolas)
- Kadell Herida/Shakir Joseph (Nicky)

Production team:

- Bijan Sheibani, Director
- Paul Burgess, Stage design
- Guy Kornetski, Lighting design
- Emma Laxton, Sound Design
- Daisy O'Flynn, Production Manager
- Abigail Gonda, Producer

== Works cited ==
- Pinter, Harold. One for the Road[: A Play]. London: Methuen, 1984. ISBN 0-413-56060-0 (10). ISBN 978-0-413-56060-5 (13). (Hardcover.)
  - –––. One for the Road: With Production Photos by Ivan Kyncl and an Interview on the Play and Its Politics. Rev. and reset ed. London: Methuen, 1985. ISBN 0-413-58370-8 (10). ISBN 978-0-413-58370-3 (13). ISBN 0-413-58950-1 (10). ISBN 978-0-413-58950-7 (13). ["With illustrations and introduction first published … in 1985" (p. 4). Includes "A Play and Its Politics: A Conversation between Harold Pinter and Nicholas Hern" (pp. 5–23).]
  - –––. One for the Road: With Production Photos by Ivan Kyncl and an Interview on the Play and Its Politics. New York: Grove Press, 1986. ISBN 0-394-62363-0 (10). ISBN 978-0-394-62363-4 (13). ISBN 0-394-54575-3 (10). ISBN 978-0-394-54575-2 (13). (Evergreen paperback ed.) ["A Play and Its Politics: A Conversation between Harold Pinter and Nicholas Hern", pp. 7–23, is dated February 1985; Includes "Postscript" by Harold Pinter, p. 24, dated May 1995.]
