= Landscape (play) =

Play written by Harold Pinter

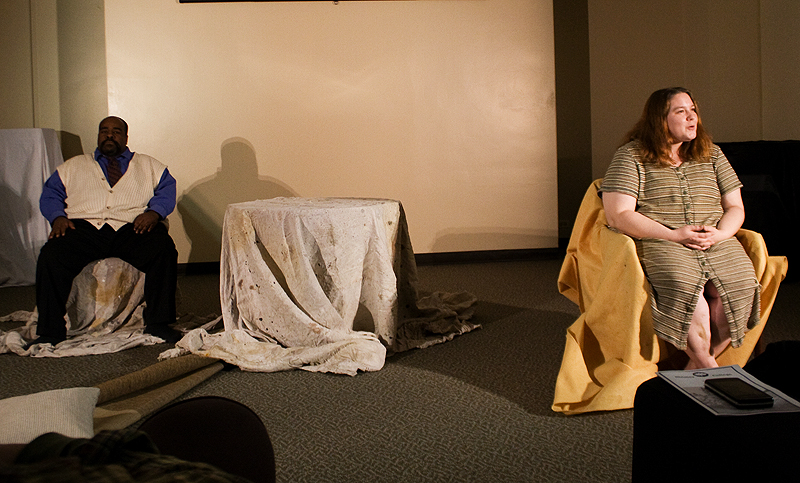
- 2008 Shimer College production
- Written by: Harold Pinter
- Characters: Beth; Duff
- Original language: English
- Genre: One-act play
- Setting: Farmhouse

Premiere
- Date premiered: 2 July 1969
- Place premiered: London

Landscape is a one-act play by Harold Pinter that was first broadcast on radio in 1968 and first performed on stage in 1969. The play shows the difficulties of communication between two people in a marriage. This is illustrated through the two characters who appear to be talking to one another though neither seems to hear the other. The dialogue resembles two independent monologues. The play is often studied, read, and performed alongside Silence, another one-act play published soon after Landscape. Both plays mark a change in Pinter's style, with echoes of the work of Samuel Beckett. In both plays nothing happens, the action of the plays is brought to a halt putting an added emphasis on the role of the dialogues and monologues that take place. As one critic put it "nothing happens but much is explored".

== Setting ==
The play is set in the kitchen of a country house. The design is minimalist in nature, consisting of a few kitchen appliances and a long kitchen table. Beth sits in an armchair to the left of the table, and Duff in a chair at the opposite end.

== Plot ==
There is virtually no plot to the play. The focus is on the interaction, or lack of it, between the two characters. The text requires that "Duff refers normally to Beth but does not appear to hear her voice" and "Beth never looks at Duff and does not appear to hear his voice. Both characters are relaxed, in no sense rigid." What plot there is exists only in the stories told by the characters. Beth reminisces to herself of a past romantic episode, whether with Duff or another man is not made clear. Duff talks of more practical matters, and finally has a short outburst of anger, evidently in frustration. Beth continues her romantic reverie as the play ends.

== Production history ==
Landscape was written for the stage, but the official theatre censor, the Lord Chamberlain, refused it a licence unless Pinter removed its strong language. The official report read: "The nearer to Beckett, the more portentous Pinter gets. This is a long one-act play without any plot or development ... a lot of useless information about the treatment of beer ... And of course, there have to be the ornamental indecencies." Pinter declined to change his text. The play was first presented as a radio broadcast on BBC Radio 3 on 25 April 1968, with Peggy Ashcroft as Beth and Eric Porter as Duff. Theatre censorship in Britain was abolished that same year and Landscape was staged by the Royal Shakespeare Company in London on 2 July 1969 with Ashcroft as Beth and David Waller as Duff, directed by Peter Hall. A film was made of the Peter Hall production with Ashcroft and Waller; it is currently available on DVD from Films Media Group of Princeton, New Jersey.

The play was produced at the Royal National Theatre in November 1994 with Penelope Wilton as Beth and Ian Holm as Duff, directed by the author. This production was also broadcast on BBC Radio 4 in 1995.

The National Theatre revived the play in 2008 with Clare Higgins and Simon Russell Beale. A third radio version was broadcast by the BBC in May 2008 with Wilton again as Beth and the author playing Duff.

== Sources ==
- Gale Steven H. 1996. Encyclopedia of British Humorists: Geoffrey Chaucer to John Cleese. London: Taylor & Francis. ISBN 0-8240-5990-5.
- Pinter, Harold. 1978. Plays: Three. London: Methuen. ISBN 0-413-38480-2.
