= Silence (1969 play) =

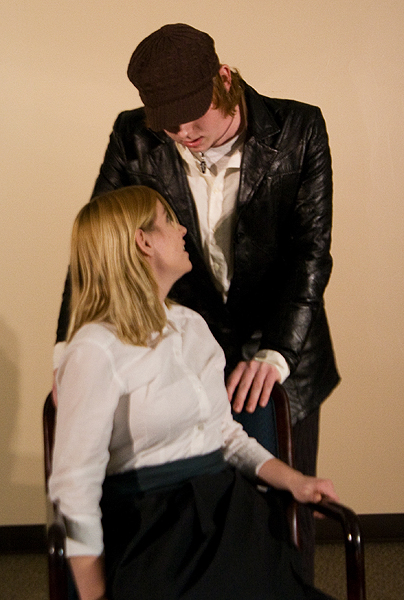
- Ellen and Bates, in 2008 Shimer College production
- Written by: Harold Pinter
- Characters: Ellen; Rumsey; Bates
- Original language: English
- Genre: One-act play

Premiere
- Date premiered: 2 July 1969
- Place premiered: London

Silence is a short play by Harold Pinter first performed in 1969.

== Production ==
The première was given by the Royal Shakespeare Company in London on 2 July 1969, directed by Peter Hall.

The cast was:

- Ellen (a girl in her twenties) – Frances Cuka
- Rumsey (a man of forty) – Anthony Bate
- Bates (a man in his middle thirties) – Norman Rodway.

The American première was given in 1970 by the Repertory Theater of Lincoln Center, with Barbara Tarbuck, Robert Symonds and James Patterson, directed by Peter Gill.

== Background ==
In the introduction to the first volume of his Complete Plays, Pinter wrote:

There are two silences. One when no word is spoken. The other when perhaps a torrent of language is being employed. This speech is speaking of a language locked beneath it. That is its continual reference. The speech we hear is an indication of that which we don't hear. It is a necessary avoidance, a violent, sly, anguished or mocking smoke screen which keeps the other in its place. When true silence falls we are still left with echo but are nearer nakedness. One way of looking at speech is to say that it is a constant stratagem to cover nakedness.

In 1977 a musical setting of the play, composed by Michael Mantler, was released as a vinyl record. The main roles were sung by Kevin Coyne, Robert Wyatt and Carla Bley.
