= A Kind of Alaska =

One-act play by Harold Pinter

A Kind of Alaska is a one-act play written in 1982 by British playwright Harold Pinter.

== Summary ==
A middle-aged woman named Deborah, who has been in a comatose state for thirty years as a result of contracting "sleepy sickness," encephalitis lethargica, awakes with a mind still that of a sixteen-year-old. She must confront a body which seems to have aged without her prior knowledge or consent. Her sister Pauline and Pauline's husband, Hornby, who has been Deborah's devoted doctor over these three decades and who may have fallen in love with her, attempt gently to ease her back to her current reality, while withholding some of the more jarring information.

Deborah reawakens to a changed world, attempting to take what appear to her to be rather shocking revelations in graceful stride, but ends the play with the ironic observation about her sister and brother-in-law that can only go so far towards accepting the realities that they have allowed her to know. Speaking of Pauline, Deborah states, bluntly: "She is a widow. She doesn't go to her ballet classes any more. Daddy and Estelle and Mummy [who is actually dead] are on a world cruise. They've stopped off in Bangkok. It'll be my birthday soon. I think I have the matter in proportion".

== Production history ==
According to his note in the published text, Pinter's idea for the play was inspired by his reading of the book Awakenings by neurologist Oliver Sacks.

A Kind of Alaska was first performed in the Cottesloe Theatre, in London, on 14 October 1982, as part of a trilogy of Pinter's plays entitled Other Places. The original cast included Judi Dench as Deborah, Paul Rogers as Hornby, and Anna Massey as Pauline. The play was revived in April 2012 by the Bristol Old Vic in a double bill with Samuel Beckett's Krapp's Last Tape. The role of Deborah was played by Marion Bailey.

== Works cited ==
- Pinter, Harold. Other Places: Four Plays. New York: Dramatists Play Service, 1984. ISBN 0-8222-0866-0 (10). ISBN 978-0-8222-0866-2. Print. [Also includes One for the Road, along with A Kind of Alaska, Victoria Station, and Family Voices.]
- –––. Other Places: Three Plays (A Kind of Alaska, Victoria Station, and Family Voices). New York: Grove Press (An Evergreen Book), 1983. Hardback ed.: ISBN 0-394-62449-1 (10). Paperback ed.: ISBN 0-8021-5189-2 (10). ISBN 978-0-8021-5189-6 (13). Print. (Page references to the paperback edition appear within parentheses above.) [A Kind of Alaska appears on 1–40.]
