= Harold Pinter and academia =

Scholarship about English playwright

Harold Pinter and academia concerns academic recognition of and scholarship pertaining to Harold Pinter, CH, CBE (1930–2008), English playwright, screenwriter, actor, director, poet, author, political activist, and the 2005 Nobel Laureate in Literature, at the time of his death considered by many "the most influential and imitated dramatist of his generation."

== Academic honours ==
Among the honours received during his lifetime, Pinter was the recipient of 20 honorary degrees or fellowships conferred by European and American academic institutions, and he was an Honorary Fellow of the Modern Language Association of America (MLA) (1970). In 2006 Pinter was elected a "foreign member" of the Department of Language and Literature of the Serbian Academy of Sciences and Arts (SASA [SANU]), and he received the Serbian Foundation Prize and the St. George Plaque of the City of Kragujevac.

Although, also due to illness, he had been unable to travel to Stockholm in December 2005 to receive his Nobel Prize and to deliver his Nobel Lecture in person, presenting it on videotape instead, Pinter did travel to Turin, Italy, in March 2006, to accept the Europe Theatre Prize; there he was the subject of an international symposium, Pinter: Passion, Poetry, Politics, curated by his official, authorised biographer, Michael Billington, whose participants included "distinguished" academics from the United States and Europe.

He was the subject of two international academic conferences in March and April 2007. Viva Pinter: Hommage à Harold Pinter, Prix Nobel de Littérature 2005, Légion d'Honneur 2007, organised by Professor Brigitte Gauthier of the University of Lyon's Université Jean Moulin (Lyon 3), in Lyon, France, focused on connections between Pinter's support for human rights, his dramatic works, his poetry, and his films, hosting various events, including productions, panel discussions, and screenings for students, guests, and the public; it was held from 2 to 21 March 2007, with an international colloquium following from 22 to 24 March 2007.

In conjunction with Pinter's being awarded the honorary degree of Doctor of Letters from the University of Leeds, School of English, on 13 April 2007, which he was able to accept in person, there was a three-day academic conference Artist and Citizen: 50 Years of Performing Harold Pinter at the University's Workshop Theatre, co-sponsored by The Harold Pinter Society, held from 12 to 14 April. The honorary degree ceremony on the 13th was conducted by University Chancellor Lord Melvyn Bragg.

In the spring of 2008, in absentia, Pinter was awarded the Doctor Honoris Causa by the University of Kragujevac. On 23 June 2008, he was awarded the honorary degree of Doctor of Letters from the University of Cambridge, in absentia.

On 11 December 2008, the press media reported that Pinter received an honorary degree (an honorary fellowship) from the Central School of Speech and Drama (CSSD), in London, also in absentia, as he "was forced to withdraw from the [honorary degree ceremony] event due to illness."

In October 2008, two months prior to his death on 24 December, Pinter also became honorary president of the Central School of Speech and Drama, a constituent college of the University of London, and received his 20th honorary award, from that institution, on 10 December 2008, in absentia because of illness.

== Harold Pinter Society ==
In 1986, at an annual convention of the Modern Language Association (MLA), Steven H. Gale, who became the organisation's first president, brought together several American academic scholars to form The Harold Pinter Society, which later became an Allied Organization of the MLA and an Associated Organization of the Midwest Modern Language Association (M/MLA). The Pinter Society is international in membership and scope, according to the masthead of The Pinter Review and the Society's Webpages (home page). According to the website of the International Pinter Society, its members are "dedicated to studying, celebrating, and appraising the works of this prolific and frequently enigmatic writer" (home page). As an MLA Allied Organization, it organises "a business meeting, programs in which scholars present papers, and related social events at the MLA annual convention." The home page also lists the officers of the Society: President Ann C. Hall (Ohio Dominican University); Vice-President Mark Taylor-Batty (University of Leeds), who designs and maintains the Society's website; and Treasurer Judith Roof (Rice University), who edits and distributes its newsletters to an electronic subscribers' mailing list. The most recent newsletters can be downloaded from the Society's website.

Photographed cover of The Pinter Review (2004)

=== The Pinter Review ===
Members of The Harold Pinter Society and individual and institutional subscribers receive The Pinter Review, whose founding co-editors are Francis Gillen (University of Tampa) and Steven H. Gale (Kentucky State University), an academic journal first published in conjunction with the Pinter Society by The University of Tampa Press in 1987.

The Pinter Review became a collection of Annual Essays in 1989 and then a biennial book publication of Collected Essays in 1997 and 1998; it is published in both hardcover and softcover editions. Each issue or volume contains a bibliography of works, productions, and other events by and about Pinter compiled by Bibliographical Editor Susan Hollis Merritt.

The cover of The Pinter Review: Collected Essays 2003 and 2004 (published by The University of Tampa Press in 2004) features Pinter's poems "Meeting" (August 2002) and "After Lunch" (September 2002), which, along with some of his other recent poetry, are both posted on his official website.

The Pinter Review: Nobel Prize/Europe Theatre Prize Volume: 2005–2008, a special "celebratory" volume edited by Francis Gillen with Steven H. Gale, was published by The University of Tampa Press in 2008. Gillen updated his introduction with an "Editor's Note" to account for Pinter's death, which occurred on 24 December 2008, "While this volume was going to press" (xi). Consisting of 347 pages, this special volume is "dedicated to Harold Pinter—in celebration" and to the memory of Gillen's late wife, Marie C. Gillen. Among its contributions, it includes: the "Presentation Speech for the 2005 Nobel Prize in Literature", by Per Wäsberg (3–5); Pinter's 2005 Nobel Lecture "Art, Truth and Politics" (6–17); and his May 2006 dramatic sketch "Apart from That" (18–19). The softcover edition and the dust jacket of the hardcover edition feature a photograph of "p. 12" of Pinter's handwritten manuscript of his 2005 Nobel Lecture. The volume's first page features the poem "Grandpa", written by Pinter's step-grandson Simon Soros between Christmas Eve and Christmas Day 2008, after Pinter's death (Driscoll); and the second page (opposite) features the poem "To My Wife", written by Pinter for Antonia Fraser in June 2004. The "Harold Pinter Bibliography: 2002–2004" (262–343), compiled by Susan Hollis Merritt, includes a "Special Supplement on the 2005 Nobel Prize in Literature, October 2005 – May 2006."

Conference poster, University of Leeds

=== Artist and Citizen: 50 Years of Performing Pinter ===
The University of Leeds's Workshop Theatre hosted Artist and Citizen: 50 Years of Performing Pinter, organised by Senior Lecturer in Theatre Studies Mark Taylor-Batty, for the Harold Pinter Society. From 12 to 14 April 2007, the conferees celebrated the 50th anniversary of the first production of Harold Pinter's first play, The Room. On 13 April Pinter was awarded the honorary degree of Doctor of Letters from the School of English by University Chancellor Melvyn Bragg. Invited guests included: Harold Pinter, Henry Woolf, reprising his original role as Mr. Kidd in a revival of The Room and his performance as the Man in Monologue (1980); Michael Billington, leading a roundtable discussion on "Working with Pinter" with composer James Clarke, visiting playwright in residence Donald Freed, and Pinter directors Katie Read and Ian Rickson; and plenary speakers Steven H. Gale and Susan Hollis Merritt.

The conference poster features a photograph of a portrait of Harold Pinter by artist Amy Shuckburgh. The portrait ("pastel and acrylic on wood, 2006") was on display at the Workshop Theatre during the conference, displayed later at Trafalgar Studios, during Harry Burton's production of The Dumb Waiter, and also "reproduced in the programmes for The Dumb Waiter; the touring production of Old Times; Betrayal at the Donmar Warehouse; and The Hothouse at the National Theatre, London."

Following the honorary degree ceremony, on the evening of 13 April 2007, the Free Theatre, of Minsk, Belarus, where several of its members have been censored, imprisoned, and "under attack" by the authorities, performed their "collage" of Pinter's work Being Harold Pinter, introduced by "their patron" Sir Tom Stoppard, receiving strong notices from Billington and his colleagues; Pinter participated in the post-performance discussion with the company through a Belarusian-English interpreter. After Pinter added his support to recommendations by Tom Stoppard, Václav Havel, and Arthur Kopit, the European Theatre Convention invited the Belarus Free Theatre to become a member, waiving the membership fee.

== The Pinter Centre for Performance and Creative Writing ==
Goldsmiths College, University of London, inaugurated its Pinter Centre in June 2003, installing Harold Pinter as its honorary president. Directed by Professor of Drama Robert Gordon, it is "an interdisciplinary research centre, involving principally the Departments of English & Comparative Literature and of Drama, the latter organising and hosting the Centre, and with links in Media and Communications, Music, PACE and the Digital Studios." Consistent with "Pinter's keen awareness of the centrality of political issues", according to its mission statement, the Pinter Centre "is particularly committed to looking at postcolonial and diasporic literature and performance, and the ways in which contemporary creativity is forging new forms that respond to the cultural diversity of the world in which we live. It also has a strong interest in questions of gender, and writing and performing the body."

The section on the Pinter Centre in "Introducing the Department of Drama", part of a document on "Drama" published by Goldsmiths, observes that "The Department of Drama founded the Pinter Centre in 2003 as an interdisciplinary research centre dedicated to performance research"; after it "widened its remit to embrace both performance and writing", the Pinter Centre was renamed to include Creative Writing, "becoming the focus for the many different writing courses and research activities concerned with writing and dramaturgy within Goldsmiths." Among its previous conferences and symposia, the Pinter Centre hosted "an international conference" on Stephen Sondheim: Collaborator and Auteur, in 2005, and, Ravenhill 10, "a major conference to celebrate 10 years of work by the playwright Mark Ravenhill, in November 2006.

The Pinter Centre's official website (as periodically updated) provides news and a schedule of its upcoming events; information about its collaborative research project "Beyond the Linear Narrative: Fractured Narratives in Writing and Performance in the Postcolonial era"; The Pinter Centre Blog ("a resource for anyone interested in the work and influence of Harold Pinter, post-colonial writing and performance, life writing and the future of the fractured narrative", the focus of its Beyond the Linear Narrative project); "In Memoriam: Harold Pinter"; the "Department of Drama" at Goldsmiths; and related links.

== Harold Pinter: A Bibliographical History ==

Harold Pinter: A Bibliographical History, compiled by William Baker and John C. Ross, was published by the British Library and Oak Knoll Press in 2005. As a result of Pinter's winning the 2005 Nobel Prize in Literature, according to its publisher, the book, which "provides a comprehensive account of the print-published writings, and texts in other media, which he has wholly or partly authored", became an academic library best-seller.

Susan Hollis Merritt provides an intensive analysis of the book in The Pinter Review: Nobel Prize/Europe Theatre Prize Volume (238–60; dust jacket).

== The Harold Pinter Archive in the British Library ==
The Harold Pinter Archive in the British Library is the literary archive of Harold Pinter, which Pinter had first placed "on permanent loan" in the British Library in September 1993 and which became a permanent acquisition in December 2007. On 11 December 2007 the British Library announced that it had purchased Pinter's literary archive for £1.1 million (approx. $2.24 million), augmenting its current "Harold Pinter Archive" of 80 boxes ("Loan 110 A"). It comprises "over one hundred and fifty boxes of manuscripts, scrapbooks, letters, photographs, programmes, and emails", constituting "an invaluable resource for researchers and scholars of Pinter's work for stage, cinema, and poetry." The work of cataloguing the full archive, a process documented in the BL's official Harold Pinter Archive Blog, was completed in December 2008 (before Pinter's death on the 24th), the description of its contents was uploaded to the BL Additional Manuscripts Online Catalogue on 2 February 2009, and then the archive was re-opened to qualified researchers and scholars.

== Pinter's attitudes toward academic analysis of his work ==
Pinter satirises academics or intellectual "distance" in several of his plays, beginning with his character Edward, a scholarly writer, in A Slight Ache (1959) and continuing with Teddy, an English philosophy professor in an American university who refuses to become "lost in it", in The Homecoming (1965), and Devlin, an English academic, in Ashes to Ashes (1996).

== See also ==
- Harold Pinter Drama Studio at Queen Mary, University of London

== Works cited ==
Bibliographical resources

- Baker, William, and John C. Ross, comps. Harold Pinter: A Bibliographical History. London: The British Library and New Castle, Delaware: Oak Knoll P, 2005. ISBN 1-58456-156-4 (10). ISBN 978-1-58456-156-9 (13). Print. ("Oak Knoll Press Bestsellers", "Spring – Summer 2007 Catalogue" (PDF). Archived from the original (PDF) on 28 February 2008. (9.25 MB). Oak Knoll Press, 2007. Web. 2 October 2007.)
- The Swedish Academy. "Biobibliographical Notes" and "Bibliography" for "Harold Pinter, Nobel Prize in Literature 2005." In "Bio-bibliography", in The Nobel Prize in Literature 2005. nobelprize.org. The Swedish Academy and The Nobel Foundation, Oct. 2005. Accessed 6 January 2009. (English HTML version; additional PDF versions accessible in English, French, German, and Swedish via hyperlinks.)
- Harry Ransom Humanities Research Center. Harold Pinter: An Inventory of His Collection at the Harry Ransom Humanities Research Center (1960–1980). Austin: University of Texas at Austin, 1999. Accessed 5 April 2009.
- "Links: Libraries and Academia" and "Publications": "Works By" and "Works About" Pinter. haroldpinter.org. Harold Pinter, 2000–[2009]. Web. 18 April 2009.
- Merritt, Susan Hollis, comp. "Harold Pinter Bibliography". SusanHollisMerritt.org. Susan Hollis Merritt, 2009. Accessed 18 April 2009. (Webpage pertaining to the "Harold Pinter Bibliography" published in The Pinter Review. Tampa: U of Tampa P, 1987–present.)
- –––. "Harold Pinter Bibliography: 2000–2002." in The Pinter Review: Collected Essays 2003 and 2004. Ed. Francis Gillen and Steven H. Gale. Tampa: University of Tampa Press, 2004. 242–300.
- –––. "Harold Pinter Bibliography: 2002–2004, With a Special Supplement on the 2005 Nobel Prize in Literature, October 2005 – May 2006." in The Pinter Review: Nobel Prize/Europe Theatre Prize Volume: 2005–2008. Ed. Francis Gillen with Steven H. Gale. Tampa: U of Tampa P, 2008. 261–343.
- The Pinter Review. Tampa: University of Tampa Press, 1987–present). Ed. Francis Gillen and Steven H. Gale. HaroldPinter.org. Harold Pinter, 2000–[2008]. Accessed 3 January 2009. [Table of contents of past issues, as re-typed on index Webpage; occasional typographical variations.]
- The Pinter Review: Nobel Prize/Europe Theatre Prize Volume: 2005–2008. Ed. Francis Gillen with Steven H. Gale. Tampa: University of Tampa Press, 2008. ISBN 978-1-879852-19-8 (hardcover).

The Harold Pinter Archive in the British Library

- Harold Pinter Archive Blog: British Library Curators on Cataloguing the Pinter Archive. BL, London, 17 March 2008 – the present. Accessed 11 March 2009. [Hosted for the British Library (BL) by Typepad. Provides updates about the cataloguing process by Pinter Archive cataloguer Kate O'Brien and the other BL curators, including Jamie Andrews, director of Modern Literary Manuscripts, where the Archive is housed.]
- "Manuscripts: Recent Acquisitions: The Pinter Archive". BL, London, 2007. Accessed 11 March 2009. ["Information about major new manuscript and archive acquisitions. Recent acquisitions include the Ted Hughes and Harold Pinter archives and the Dering Roll … The archive of Britain's leading playwright and writer, the 2005 Literature Nobel Laureate Harold Pinter, has been acquired by the British Library. It comprises over 150 boxes of manuscripts, scrapbooks, letters, photographs, programmes, and emails offers an invaluable resource for researchers and scholars of Pinter's work for stage, cinema, and poetry." (Includes hyperlinks to the National Heritage Memorial Fund, which funded the acquisition, and The UK Literary Heritage Working Group.)]

Obituaries and memorials

- Adams, Stephen. "Harold Pinter Directs His Own Funeral". Daily Telegraph. 31 December 2008. Web. 6 January 2009. ("His plays were masterpieces of artistic control. And even at his own funeral Harold Pinter made sure he exerted a director's influence.")
- Billington, Michael. "Harold Pinter". Guardian. Guardian Media Group, 25 December 2008. Web. 25 December 2008.
- Dodds, Paisley (Associated Press). "Nobel-winning Playwright Harold Pinter Dies at 78". ABC News. American Broadcasting Company, 25 December 2008. Web. 14 March 2009.
- Driscoll, Margarette. "Yo, Grandpa Pinter, Big Respect". Times Online. 11 January 2009. Web. 11 January 2009. [See the poem "Grandpa", Simon Soros 2008, listed below.]
- Gussow, Mel, and Ben Brantley."Harold Pinter, Playwright of the Pause, Dies at 78". New York Times. 25 December 2008, Theater. Web. 26 December 2008.
- "In Memoriam: Harold Pinter". The Pinter Centre for the Study of Performance and Creative Writing, Goldsmiths, University of London. Goldsmiths College, University of London, 2008. Web. 23 April 2009.
- Soros, Simon. "Grandpa". Sunday Times. News International (News Corporation), 11 January 2009. Web. 11 January 2009. ( Simon Soros 2008). [See hyperlinked account by Driscoll listed above; also published in print as listed below.]
- Soros, Simon. "Grandpa". The Pinter Review: Nobel Prize/Europe Theatre Prize Volume: 2005–2008. Ed. Francis Gillen with Steven H. Gale. Tampa: U of Tampa P, 2008. 1. Print.
