= The Tragedy of King Lear (screenplay) =

Unpublished screenplay by Harold Pinter

The Tragedy of King Lear is an unpublished screenplay by Harold Pinter. It is an adaptation of William Shakespeare's King Lear and was commissioned by actor and director Tim Roth with backing from Film Four. Pinter completed the screenplay on 31 March 2000, but as of 2017 it has not been filmed. It is one of only three screenplays that Pinter adapted from another dramatist's play, the others being his screenplay adaptation of Butley, by his good friend Simon Gray, and Sleuth, originally written for the stage by Anthony Shaffer.

Roth told the Independent in February 2000, before Pinter completed the screenplay, "This is a very hefty piece, to say the least, and I'm not interested in a bunch of people standing around a castle talking. … What Harold Pinter will do is rearrange, cut and then turn it from a stage piece into cinema." At the time, Roth was "working with Dixie Linder, the producer of his directorial debut about incest, The War Zone, with whom he formed the company Roth-Linder Productions.

Commenting on how "active" were their plans to film King Lear, Roth's coproducer Dixie Linder told her interviewer, actress Lysette Anthony, in an interview for Vivid Magazine:

"it's so difficult. We've got this amazing A-list cast, and Harold Pinter adapted it. But the problem is no one really wants to do [a film of] Shakespeare at the moment. It's expensive. Everyone says 'Well, you know, it's a tragedy...' In fact my favourite comment on this script was 'it's very downbeat...' And I said, It was a tragedy to begin with!!! I mean did you think we were going to re-write it and make it a comedy?"

Manuscripts and typedrafts for this work and related correspondence pertaining to it are part of The Harold Pinter Archive in the British Library. Based on those materials, this unpublished and unfilmed screenplay is discussed briefly by Pinter's official authorised biographer, Michael Billington, who points out that Pinter completed it in March 2000, and, in passing, by Steven H. Gale, in his introduction to his edited collection of essays The Films of Harold Pinter, and, also relatively briefly, in his book Sharp Cut: Harold Pinter's Screenplays and the Artistic Process, citing an 88-page typedraft.
