= The Dreaming Child =

Screenplay by Harold Pinter

The Dreaming Child is a screenplay by Harold Pinter (1930–2008), the 2005 Nobel Laureate in Literature, which he completed in 1997 and published in volume 3 of his Collected Screenplays (2000). It has not yet been filmed but was produced as a radio play by Feelgood Films for BBC Radio Four's Unmade Movies series in 2015. It is an adaptation of the short story "The Dreaming Child" by Danish author Karen Blixen (a.k.a. Isak Dinesen). Pinter's manuscripts for this work are housed in The Harold Pinter Archive in the British Library.

== Background ==
The co-editor of The Pinter Review Francis X. Gillen discusses the genesis of Pinter's unpublished screenplay, based on materials in the Archive, in his essay on this work, focusing on Pinter's "political vision" in his adaptation of Blixen's short story to the film medium.

According to his official website and correspondence in the Archive cited by Gillen, Pinter's screen adaptation was commissioned by actress Julia Ormond, who wanted to produce and to direct a film of this work:

Julia Ormond commissioned this Pinter screenplay -- a 19th-century tale of a mother's failure to love her adopted child -- as part of her 20th Century Fox development deal as producer/director. Her first offering as producer was the television documentary Calling the Ghost based on two women's suffering in Bosnia. Talking about Pinter she told the Evening Standard in October 1997, "Working with him is the highlight of my career. I think he has done a brilliant script and I hope we will get the green light soon."

At the time of Pinter's death, 24 December 2008, the film had still not been made. The screenplay was first broadcast as a radio play on BBC Radio 4 on 5 March 2015.

In Harold Pinter his official authorised biographer Michael Billington quotes Pinter's comment, "I had enormous respect for both Julia and her vision … but she was intent on directing, as well as producing, the film and in the end it was this that brought the project to its knees. The money-men simply wouldn't give her the chance" (398). Billington, who describes the screenplay as "remarkable", adds, "Which is sad because Pinter's screenplay is on a level with his work for Joseph Losey. It [Pinter's comment] is also a perfect riposte to the sceptics who argue that Pinter's political engagement has diluted his aesthetic sensibility," as he finds "Pinter's keen awareness of mortality and compensating hunger for life" to be "also apparent" in this "remarkable" screenplay (398).

== Plot summary ==
Billington summarizes Blixen's story in some detail, stating that it

concerns a slum child, Jens, who is endowed awith an extra-sensory imaginative power. Adopted by the wealthy but childless Jakob and Emilie, Jens emobodies a totality of vision: he is both instinctively at home in the grand house and yet retains vivid memories of his slum origins. But it is ony through Jens's death that Emilie, who before her marriage had rejected an impassioned lover, is regenerated: it is as if the spirit of the dreaming child [Jens] has passed into her and she is able to become a poetic fabulist like him. (398)

== Critical analysis ==
Billington concludes, "It is an intriguing story and you can see why Ormond and Pinter were attracted to it. But Blixen, who married her baronial cousin and later lived on a Kenyan coffee plantation"—made famous in the 1985 film adaptation of her memoir Out of Africa, starring Meryl Streep and Robert Redford—"clings to a conservative belief in fate." In contrast, Billington finds, "Pinter … retains the source's narrative structure while investing it with new meaning," one which Billington acknowledges that Gillen develops in the latter's prior comparative analysis of Pinter's manuscript of the screenplay (398–99).

Gillen finds that Pinter achieves in the unpublished version of the screenplay, "both a faithful rendering and an enlargement of political consciousness" (110). Extending Gillen's perspective, Billington argues that "Pinter enriches the story by heightening its social context; and, in so doing, he demolishes the convenient myth that his political fervour has somehow diluted the art" (398–99).

== See also ==
- Harold Pinter and politics

== Works cited and further reading ==
- Billington, Michael. Harold Pinter. London: Faber and Faber, 2007. ISBN 978-0-571-23476-9 (13). Updated 2nd ed. of The Life and Work of Harold Pinter. 1996. London: Faber and Faber, 1997. ISBN 0-571-17103-6 (10). Print.
- Gale, Steven H. Sharp Cut: Harold Pinter's Screenplays and the Artistic Process. Lexington, KY: The UP of Kentucky, 2003. ISBN 0-8131-2244-9 (10). ISBN 978-0-8131-2244-1 (13). Print.
- –––, ed. and introd. The Films of Harold Pinter. Albany: SUNY P, 2001. ISBN 0-7914-4932-7. ISBN 978-0-7914-4932-5. Print. [A collection of essays.]
- Gillen, Francis X. "Isak Dinesen with a Contemporary Social Conscience: Harold Pinter's Film Adaptation of 'The Dreaming Child'." Chap. 10 in Gale, The Films of Harold Pinter 147–58. [In Gillen's articles "All references are to the unpublished manuscript," provided in advance of its publication by Harold Pinter for purposes of Gillen's research.]
- –––. " 'My Dark House': Harold Pinter's Political Vision in His Screen Adaption of Karen Blixen's 'The Dreaming Child'." The Pinter Review: Collected Essays: 1997 and 1998. Ed. Francis Gillen and Steven H. Gale. Tampa: U of Tampa P, 1998. 110–22.
- Pinter, Harold. The Dreaming Child. Collected Screenplays. In 3 vols. London: Faber, 2000. 3: 441–551.
