= Remembrance of Things Past (play) =

- Original language: English
- Written by: Marcel Proust, adapted by Harold Pinter and Di Trevis
- Setting: Paris, during World War I and the years prior to it

Premiere
- Date: 23 November 2000
- Place: Cottesloe Theatre, National Theatre
- Official website

Remembrance of Things Past is the 2000 collaborative stage adaptation by Harold Pinter and director Di Trevis of Harold Pinter's as-yet unproduced The Proust Screenplay (1977), a screen adaptation of À la recherche du temps perdu, the 1913–1927 seven-volume novel by Marcel Proust.

In November 2000, the play premiered at the Royal National Theatre, in London, under the direction of Trevis, who also produced and directed it with a student cast at the Victorian College of the Arts Drama School, in Melbourne, Australia, in October 2002. There also were foreign-language productions of the play in Denmark and Slovenia in 2004.

== The Proust Screenplay ==
In writing The Proust Screenplay, Pinter adapted the seven volumes of Marcel Proust's magnum opus À la recherche du temps perdu for a film commissioned by the late director Joseph Losey to be directed by Losey. According to Pinter in conversation with Jonathan Croall and with Michael Billington, his official biographer, Losey and Pinter were not able to find the financing for the film and there were unsurmountable casting difficulties; (Note: "Although the main problem was raising the money, there were also difficulties over casting. While Pinter wanted to use only English actors, potential backers from several European countries wanted their own actors to appear in the film. 'You could have ended up with a terrible pudding of actors speaking three thousand different dialects, in broken English,' Pinter suggests. 'I didn't like the sound of that at all'.") yet, after a year's work and other cultural complications pertaining to negotiations about permission to adapt Proust's great work from principals in France, Pinter finished his first draft of the screenplay in November 1972.

The Proust Screenplay, in Billington's view "a masterpiece ... [which] captures Proust's merciless social comedy", was eventually published by Grove Press in both hardback and paperback in 1977 and by Faber and Faber in hardback in 1978. The stage play was published by Faber and Faber in 2000. Pinter's unpublished manuscripts for both the screenplay and the play are held in The Harold Pinter Archive in the British Library, which the BL acquired permanently in December 2007, and planned to finish cataloguing in late 2008. The Harold Pinter Archive catalogue went on-line on Monday 2 February 2009 and became fully visible on Tuesday 3 February.

Michael Bakewell adapted Pinter's screenplay into a radio play also titled The Proust Screenplay directed by Ned Chaillet and featuring Pinter as narrator, broadcast on BBC Radio 3 on 31 December 1995 and as an extended repeat on 11 May 1997.

== Original production ==
The stage version, which premiered at the Cottesloe Theatre, National Theatre on 23 November 2000 and ran there through 7 February 2001, was directed by Di Trevis and starred Sebastian Harcombe (Marcel), Duncan Bell (Charles Swann), David Rintoul (Charlus), and Fritha Goodey (Odette de Crecy). Designed by Alison Chitty, the production included music by Dominic Muldowney, lighting designed by Ben Ormerod, and movement directed by choreographer Jack Murphy.

The production transferred to the Olivier Theatre, National Theatre, running from 23 February until 4 April 2001.

== Works cited and further reading ==
- Baker, William and Ross, John C. (2005). Harold Pinter: A Bibliographical History. London: British Library. ISBN 0-7123-4885-9. New Castle, DE: Oak Knoll Press, 2005. ISBN 1-58456-156-4.
- Billington, Michael (2007). Harold Pinter (2nd rev. ed.). London: Faber and Faber. ISBN 978-0-571-23476-9.
  - Billington, Michael (1996). The Life and Work of Harold Pinter. London: Faber and Faber. ISBN 0-571-17103-6.
- Gale, Steven H. and Hudgins, Christopher (1997). Francis Gillen and Steven H. Gale (eds.). "The Harold Pinter Archives II: A Description of the Filmscript Materials in the Archive in the British Library". The Pinter Review: Annual Essays 1995 and 1996. Tampa University of Tampa Press: 101–142. (Follows up article by Merritt listed below; does not include an updated version of Merritt's "Appendix"; focuses on manuscript materials relating to Pinter's screenplays.)
- Merritt, Susan Hollis (1994). Francis Gillen and Steven H. Gale (eds.). "The Harold Pinter Archive in the British Library". The Pinter Review: Annual Essays 1994. Tampa: University of Tampa Press: 14–53. (Includes an Appendix listing the holdings of the Archive through 64 boxes, including the unpublished manuscripts pertaining to The Proust Screenplay: À la recherche du temps perdu, adapt. by Pinter, and Remembrance of Things Past, adapt. collaboratively from Pinter's The Proust Screenplay, by Pinter and Di Trevis.)
- Pinter, Harold. The Proust Screenplay: À la recherche du temps perdu. New York: Grove Press (Dist. Random House), 1977. ISBN 0-394-42202-3 (10). London: Faber and Faber, 1978. ISBN 0-413-38960-X (10). (Adapt. for the screen of the 7-vol. novel by Marcel Proust.)
- ——— and Trevis, Di (2000). Remembrance of Things Past. London: Faber and Faber. ISBN 0-571-20760-X. ISBN 978-0-571-20760-2. (Adapt. for the stage of The Proust Screenplay: À la recherche du temps perdu, by Harold Pinter.)
- ——— and Croall, Jonathan (Spring 2001). "Time Present and Time Past". National Theatre Official Website. ("Harold Pinter talks to Jonathan Croall about the daunting task of adapting Marcel Proust's masterpiece for the theatre.")
