= The Room (play) =

1957 play by Harold Pinter

- Original language: English
- Written by: Harold Pinter
- Characters: Bert Hudd; Rose; Mr. Kidd; Mr. Sands; Mrs. Sands; Riley
- Genre: Tragicomedy; Comedy of menace
- Setting: A room in a large house

Premiere
- Date: May 1957
- Place: University of Bristol; UK
- Official website

The Room is Harold Pinter's first play, written and first produced in 1957. Considered by critics the earliest example of Pinter's "comedy of menace", this play has strong similarities to Pinter's second play, The Birthday Party, including features considered hallmarks of Pinter's early work and of the so-called Pinteresque: dialogue that is comically familiar and yet disturbingly unfamiliar, simultaneously or alternatingly both mundane and frightening; subtle yet contradictory and ambiguous characterizations; a comic yet menacing mood characteristic of mid-twentieth-century English tragicomedy; a plot featuring reversals and surprises that can be both funny and emotionally moving; and an unconventional ending that leaves at least some questions unresolved.

== Setting and characters ==
Pinter has confirmed that his visit, in the summer of 1955, to the "broken-down room" of Quentin Crisp, located in Chelsea's Beaufort Street (now renovated and part of a "smart building"), inspired his writing The Room, "set in 'a snug, stuffy rather down-at-heel bedsit with a gas fire and cooking facilities'." The bedsit is located in an equally rundown rooming house which, like that of Pinter's next play, The Birthday Party, becomes the scene of a visitation by apparent strangers. Though the single-dwelling two-storey house in the later play is in an unidentified "seaside town", and it is purportedly a bed and breakfast-type rooming house run by a childless middle-aged married couple, the building in which Rose and Bert Hudd inhabit their "room" is a multi-dwelling rooming house of more than two storeys, and, while Rose accepts being addressed as "Mrs. Hudd", Bert Hudd and she may not actually be legally married to each other, which may be a factor leading to her defensiveness throughout the play.

== Plot summary ==
The play opens with Rose having a "one-person dialog" with her husband Bert, who remains silent throughout the whole scene, while serving him a breakfast fry-up, although the scene appears to occur around evening. Rose talks mostly about the cold weather and keeps comparing the cosy, warm room to the dark, damp basement and to the cold weather outside. She creates a sense of uneasiness by the way she talks and acts, always moving from one place to another in the room, even while sitting, she sits in a rocking chair and rocks. Her speech is filled with many quick subject changes and asks her husband questions, yet answers them herself.

With a few knocks and a permission to enter, Mr. Kidd, the old landlord, enters. He asks Bert many questions regarding if and when he is leaving the room. The questions are answered by Rose while Bert still remains silent. The dialog between Rose and Mr. Kidd consists of many subjects that change very frequently. At times each one of them talks about something different and it seems they are avoiding subjects and aren't listening to each other, creating an irrational dialog. At the end of the scene Bert, who appears to be a truck driver, leaves to drive off in his "van".

Afterward, Rose's attempt to take out the garbage is interrupted by a young couple, Mr. and Mrs. Sands. She invites the couple in and they tell her they are looking for a flat, and for her landlord, Mr. Kidd.

A blind black man, named Riley, who has purportedly been waiting in the basement according to the Sands and Mr. Kidd, becoming a source of concern for Rose, suddenly arrives upstairs to her room, to deliver a mysterious message to Rose from her "father". The play ends violently when Bert returns, finds Rose stroking Riley's face, delivers a long sexually-suggestive monologue about his experience driving his van while referring to it as if it was a woman, and then beats Riley until he appears lifeless, possibly murdering him, after which Rose cries "Can't see. I can't see. I can't see".

== Composition history ==
Pinter wrote The Room over two or four days in 1957, depending on the account, at the suggestion of his friend Henry Woolf for his production as part of a postgraduate program in directing at the University of Bristol, Bristol, England.

In their published interviews, Pinter and Woolf vary in describing how many days Pinter took to write The Room. According to Billington, in his official biography Harold Pinter, Woolf asked Pinter to write the play in a letter that Pinter received in the autumn of 1956, when he "was newly married" to actress Vivien Merchant "and in the middle of a season at Torquay"; "[Pinter] replied that he couldn't possibly deliver anything in under six months. In fact, the play arrived in the post very shortly. It was written over four afternoons and late nights while Pinter was playing in Rattigan's Separate Tables at the Pavilion Theatre, Torquay, in November 1956. The Room, as the play was called, was eventually staged by the Bristol Drama Department in May 1957 in a converted squash-court and in a production by Woolf himself" (66–67).

In a conversation with friend Gordon Bowker in 1964, Woolf claims that in the process of undertaking his directing course at Bristol in 1957, he asked his old school friend Harold Pinter if he could write a one act play for him to produce for his graduation. Pinter said that he had never written a play before but would give it a try. According to Woolf, Pinter "said he couldn't write a play in under six months. He wrote it in two days, he says four days, no it wasn't it was two days."

== Production history ==
The Room was first produced by Henry Woolf and presented at The Drama Studio at the University of Bristol in May 1957 and that first night was reviewed by David Foot for the Bristol Evening World(review available to read in "Footprints' by Stephen Chalke) and again as part of the National Student Drama Festival held at the University of Bristol in 1958. It was at this second performance that the play was first reviewed by the London Sunday Times by drama critic Harold Hobson, who had helped to found the Drama Festival with some of his colleagues. The original production featured the following cast:

- Bert Hudd - Claude Jenkins
- Rose Hudd - Susan Engel
- Mr. Kidd - Henry Woolf
- Mr. Sands - David Davies
- Mrs. Sands - Auriol Smith
- Riley - George Odlum

The play was presented later at the Hampstead Theatre Club on 21 January 1960 as part of a double bill with The Dumb Waiter. It was directed by Harold Pinter and featured the following cast:

- Bert Hudd - Howard Lang
- Rose - Vivien Merchant
- Mr. Kidd - Henry Woolf
- Mr. Sands - John Rees
- Mrs. Sands - Auriol Smith
- Riley - Thomas Baptiste

The double bill was transferred on 8 March 1960 to the Royal Court Theatre where it was directed by Anthony Page with the following cast:

- Bert Hudd - Michael Brennan
- Rose - Vivien Merchant
- Mr. Kidd - John Cater
- Mr. Sands - Michael Caine
- Mrs. Sands - Anne Bishop
- Riley - Thomas Baptiste

== Fiftieth anniversary ==
In 2007, the fiftieth anniversary of the play's first production, the Theatre Archive Project, a collaboration among the British Library, the University of Sheffield, and the British AHRC, began interviewing surviving members of the cast, as well as the author of the accompanying one-acter The Rehearsal.

In April 2007, as part of a three-day conference Artist and Citizen: 50 Years of Performing Pinter, held at the University of Leeds, in conjunction with which Pinter was awarded his seventeenth Honorary degree, Henry Woolf reprised his role as Mr. Kidd.

On 26 May 2007 students at the University of Bristol, directed by Simon Reade, mounted a production in the original performance space – a converted "squash-court" as described by Billington (67) – which was recorded by the British Library Sound Archive.

== See also ==
- Comedy of menace
- The Harold Pinter Archive in the British Library
- Theatre of the Absurd
