= The Hothouse =

1958 play by Harold Pinter

- Original language: English
- Written by: Harold Pinter
- Characters: Roote; Gibbs; Lamb; Miss Cutts; Lush; Tubb; Lobb
- Genre: Tragicomedy
- Setting: Various locations within a mental institution

Premiere
- Date: April 1980
- Place: Hampstead Theatre, London
- Official website

The Hothouse (1958/1980) is a full-length tragicomedy written by Harold Pinter in the winter of 1958 between The Birthday Party (1957) and The Caretaker (1959). After writing The Hothouse in the winter of 1958 and following the initial commercial failure of The Birthday Party, Pinter put the play aside; in 1979 he re-read it and directed its first production, at Hampstead Theatre, where it opened on 24 April 1980, transferring to the Ambassadors Theatre on 25 June 1980, and it was first published, also in 1980, by Eyre Methuen. The play received its American premiere at the Trinity Repertory Company in 1982. Pinter himself played Roote in a subsequent production staged at the Minerva Theatre, in Chichester, in 1995, later transferring to the Comedy Theatre, in London.

== Setting ==
The play is set in an institution whose nature is subject to interpretation; throughout the play, it is ambiguously referred to as both a "rest home" and a "sanitorium" but its "residents" or "patients" are designated anonymously by numbers, not by their names.

== Plot ==
The professionalism and even sanity of the institution's director, Roote, are undermined by his subordinates: the efficient and ambitious Gibbs, the aptly-named alcoholic Lush, and Miss Cutts, Roote's calculating and shrewd mistress who is also involved with Gibbs. Gibbs reminds Roote that patient 6457 is dead and informs him that patient 6459 has given birth. Shocked by this, Roote orders Gibbs to find out who the father is. In a soundproof room, Gibbs and Miss Cutts interrogate Lamb, the locktester, with strange and persistent questions, but do not let him answer. This process seems to cause him excruciating pain.

Later, Roote is told that Lamb is the father of the child and has been locked up. The staff keep remarking that something is amiss, but they don't know what. Lush gifts Roote a cigar, which explodes after he lights it, but he is unharmed. After Roote delivers a somber Christmas address, the patients of the institution break free and kill the staff, sparing the understaff.

Gibbs informs a higher-up, Lobb, that he is the sole survivor, except for Lamb, who is missing. He tells Lobb their motivation was probably that Roote had raped 6459 and murdered 6457. Lamb is seen motionless in the soundproof room.

== List of characters ==
- Roote, a man in his fifties
- Gibbs, a man in his thirties
- Lush, a man in his thirties
- Miss Cutts, a woman in her thirties
- Lamb, a man in his twenties
- Tubb, a man of fifty
- Lobb, a man of fifty

== Critical reception and interpretation ==
The play has been interpreted as a searingly comic indictment of institutional bureaucracy; its black comedy and absurdism exposing hierarchical power structures anticipate Pinter's later more overtly political dramatic sketches and plays, such as "The New World Order" (1983), One for the Road (1984), and Mountain Language (1988).

== Productions ==
=== World premiere ===
"First presented at Hampstead Theatre, London, on 24 April 1980 and transferred to the Ambassador Theatre, London on 25 June 1980"; directed by Harold Pinter.

Cast:

- Derek Newark, Roote
- James Grant, Gibbs
- Roger Davidson, Lamb
- Angela Pleasence, Miss Cutts
- Robert East, Lush
- Michael Forrest, Tubb
- Edward de Souza, Lobb

Other theatre personnel:

- Eileen Diss, Set Designer
- Elizabeth Waller, Costume Designer
- Gerry Jenkinson, Lighting
- Dominic Muldowney, Sound

=== American premiere ===
The American premiere was directed by Adrian Hall at the Trinity Repertory Company for its 1981–1982 season and transferred to the Playhouse Theatre in New York City, from 30 April through 30 May 1982, produced by Arthur Cantor Associates. Richard Kavanaugh, who played Gibbs, was nominated for "Best Performance by a Featured Actor" at the 36th Tony Awards in 1982.

Cast:

- Dan Butler, Lamb
- Peter Gerety, Lush
- David C. Jones, Lobb
- Richard Kavanaugh, Gibbs
- Howard London, Tubb
- George Martin, Roote
- Amy Van Nostrand, Miss Cutts

Other theatre personnel:

- Eugene Lee, Scenic and Lighting Design
- William Lane, Costume Design

=== London revivals ===
A revival of The Hothouse, directed by Ian Rickson, with a cast including Stephen Moore (Roote), Lia Williams (Miss Cutts), and Henry Woolf (Tubb), was staged in the Lyttelton at the Royal National Theatre, London, from 11 July to 27 October 2007.

London 2013

During May–August 2013 the play was presented at Studio One in the West End Trafalgar Studios, directed by Jamie Lloyd. It starred Simon Russell Beale, John Simm, Indira Varma, Harry Melling, John Heffernan, Clive Rowe and Christopher Timothy.
