= Di Trevis =

British theatre director (born 1947)

Diane Ellen "Di" Trevis (born 8 November 1947) is an English theatre director and actress.

== Early life and education ==
Trevis was born in Birmingham and educated at Sussex University.

== Career ==
After eight years as an actress, which included appearances in The Professionals and The Sweeney, Trevis began directing in 1981.

She was the first woman to run a company at Britain's Royal National Theatre. Between 1986 and 1993, she directed Happy Birthday Brecht, The Mother, The School for Wives, Yerma, The Resistible Rise of Arturo Ui and Inadmissible Evidence for the National. In 2000 she adapted for the stage, with Harold Pinter, Pinter's unfilmed cinema adaptation of Proust's Remembrance of Things Past. The production, which transferred to the Olivier stage in 2001, was described as "ravishing" by critic Nicholas de Jongh in the Evening Standard and won an Olivier Award.

Trevis has also worked extensively at the Royal Shakespeare Company, with productions of Happy End, The Taming of the Shrew, The Revenger's Tragedy, Much Ado About Nothing and Elgar’s Rondo. In 1991 she mounted a production of Harrison Birtwistle's opera Gawain at the Royal Opera House. She also directed The Merry Widow for Scottish Opera and The Voluptuous Tango for the Almeida.

Trevis has had a long-standing affiliation with the US, directing and teaching in New York, Los Angeles, Chicago and Pittsburgh. Her American productions include: As You Like It, The Duchess of Malfi, Human Cannon, Le Grand Meaulnes and Silverland. In December 2008 she directed London Cries at the Irondale, Brooklyn, featuring Jenny Galloway and Richard Poe. Trevis directed a production of The Beaux' Stratagem at The Pennsylvania State University in the spring of 2011.

For over a decade, Trevis has been teaching actors and directors in her international workshops. She has taught in the UK, the US, France, Germany, Austria and Cuba. Gary Oldman, Kenneth Branagh and Rupert Everett have all passed through her workshops and she has a following of young actors in London who regularly attend her Sunday workshop. Between 2003 and 2007, Trevis was Head of Directing at Drama Centre London.

A friend of Ian Charleson, Trevis contributed a to the 1990 book, For Ian Charleson: A Tribute.

Trevis published her own book, Being a Director: A Life in Theatre in 2011.

== Personal life ==
Since 1986, Trevis has been married to composer Dominic Muldowney. They live in Putney, south-west London.

== Bibliography ==
- Trevis, Di. Being a Director: A Life in Theatre. Routledge, 2011.
