= Celebration (play) =

2000 play by Harold Pinter

Celebration is a play by British playwright Harold Pinter. It was first presented as a double-bill, with Pinter's first play The Room on Thursday 16 March 2000 at the Almeida Theatre in London.

== Synopsis ==
The plot revolves around three couples dining in the most expensive restaurant in town (an allusion to The Ivy restaurant in London). At one table are sat two brothers, Lambert and Matt, and two sisters, Prue and Julie. Lambert and Julie are married, as are Matt and Prue. They are celebrating Lambert and Julie's wedding anniversary. Seated at another table are Russell and Suki, who later join the other party of diners. The diners' conversations are intersected by the existential ponderings of Richard, the restaurateur (a character based on the London restaurateur Jeremy King), Sonia the maitresse d', and an unnamed Waiter. The dialogue begins as an apparently ordinary celebratory meal for the diners developing into a complex weaving of more sinister themes, including undercurrents of love/hate relationships and incest. The play ends with a mysterious (and 'incomplete') speech from the waiter, which hints at a possible way to escape the pain of everyday life.

== Original cast ==
Lambert	Keith Allen
Matt	Andy de la Tour
Prue	Lindsay Duncan
Julie	Susan Wooldridge
Russell	Steven Pacey
Suki	Lia Williams
Richard	Thomas Wheatley
Sonia	Indira Varma
Waiter	Danny Dyer
Waitress 1	Nina Raine
Waitress 2	Katherine Tozer

== Television adaptation ==
In 2006, director John Crowley adapted Celebration for More4. It was first shown on More4 on Monday 26 February 2007.

=== Original television cast ===
Lambert	Michael Gambon
Matt	James Bolam
Prue	Julia McKenzie
Julie	Penelope Wilton
Russell	Colin Firth
Suki	Janie Dee
Richard	James Fox
The Waitress (Sonia)	Sophie Okonedo
Waiter	Stephen Rea
