= The Dumb Waiter =

1957 play by Harold Pinter

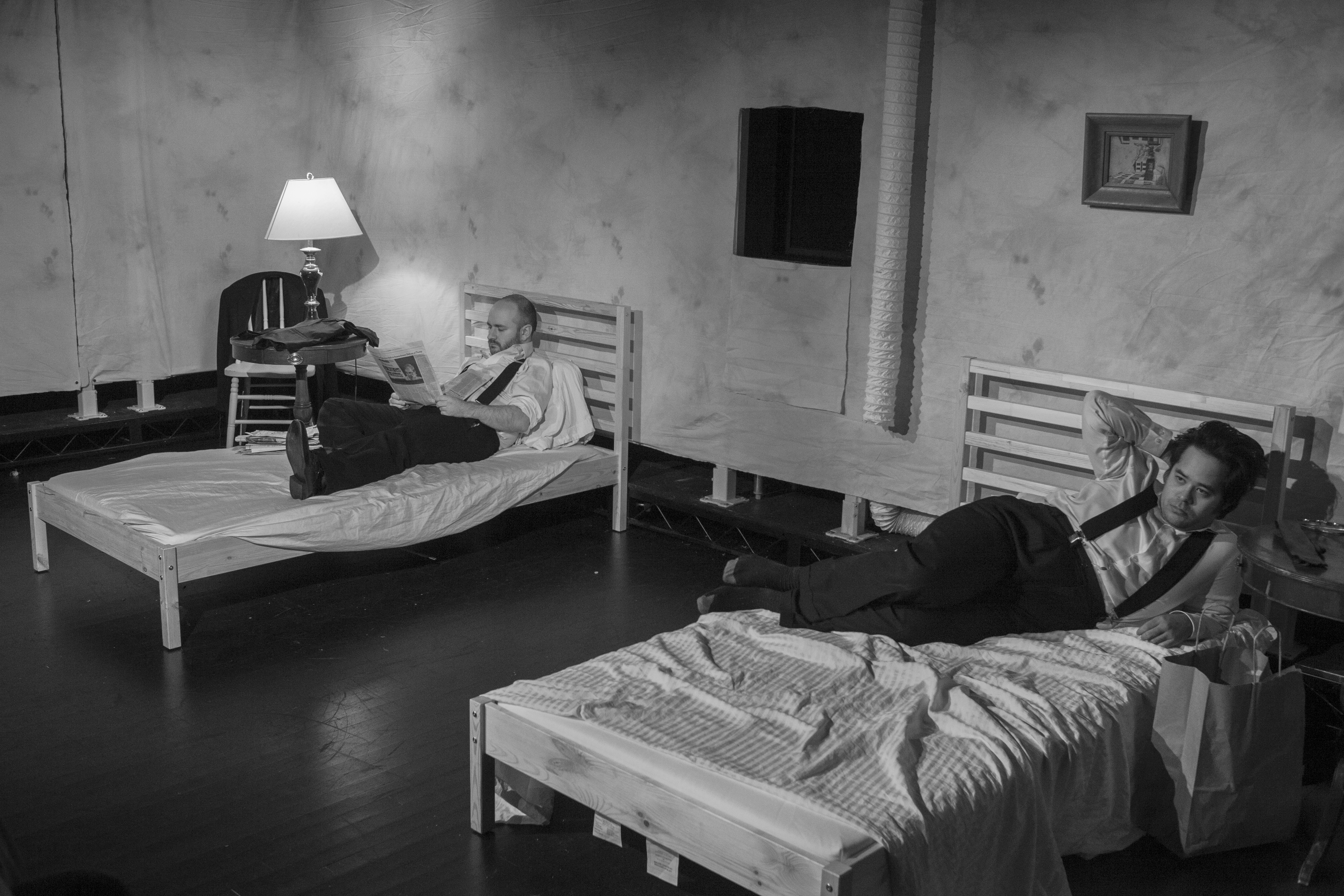
- Actors in The Dumb Waiter as presented by Stairwell Theater in 2019
- Original language: English
- Written by: Harold Pinter
- Characters: Ben; Gus
- Genre: Comedy drama
- Setting: A basement room

Premiere
- Date: 21 January 1960
- Place: Hampstead Theatre Club, United Kingdom
- Official website

The Dumb Waiter is a one-act play by Harold Pinter written in 1957.

== Plot ==
Two hit-men, Ben and Gus, are waiting in a basement room for their assignment. As the play begins, Ben, the senior member of the team, is reading a newspaper, and Gus, the junior member, is tying his shoes. Gus asks Ben many questions as he gets ready for their job and tries to make tea. They argue over the semantics of "light the kettle", "put on the kettle" and "Make the tea". Ben continues reading his paper for most of the time, occasionally reading excerpts of it to Gus. Ben gets increasingly animated, and Gus's questions become more pointed, at times nearly nonsensical.

In the back of the room is a dumbwaiter, which delivers occasional food orders. This is mysterious and both characters seem to be puzzled why these orders keep coming; the basement is clearly not outfitted as a restaurant kitchen. At one point they send up some snack food that Gus had brought along. Ben has to explain to the people above via the dumbwaiter's "speaking tube" that there is no food.

Gus leaves the room to get a drink of water in the bathroom, and the dumbwaiter's speaking tube whistles (a sign that there is a person on the other end who wishes to communicate). Ben listens carefully—we gather from his replies that their victim has arrived and is on his way to the room. Ben shouts for Gus, who is still out of the room. The door that the target is supposed to enter from flies open, Ben rounds on it with his gun, and Gus enters, stripped of his jacket, waistcoat, tie and gun. There is a long silence as the two stare at each other before the curtain falls.

== Title ==
The dumb waiter of the title refers to the serving hatch and food lift that delivers orders to the gunmen. It could also refer to Gus, who fails to realise that he is waiting to be the victim, or even to Ben, whose obedience to a higher authority eventually forces him to eliminate his partner.

== Setting ==
The windowless basement is characteristic of Pinter's sets. "Pinter's rooms are stuffy, non-specific cubes, whose atmosphere grows steadily more stale and more tense. At the opening curtain these rooms look naturalistic, meaning no more than the eye can contain. But, by the end of each play, they become sealed containers, virtual coffins."

== Style ==
Pinter's writing in The Dumb Waiter combines "the staccato rhythms of music-hall cross-talk and the urban thriller". The dialogue between Ben and Gus, while seemingly concerned only with trivial newspaper stories, football matches and cups of tea, reveals their characters. In Pinter's early plays, "it is language that betrays the villains – more pat, more cliché-ridden, with more brute power than that of their victims".

In the theatre, the emotional power of the play is more readily felt than understood. Pinter "created his own theatrical grammar – he didn't merely write characters that had an emotional response to something ... But instead, through his characters' interactions and phrasings, Pinter seemed to conjure the very visceral emotion itself".

== Interpretation ==
Although the play is realistic in many ways, particularly the dialogue between Ben and Gus, there are also elements that are unexplained and seemingly absurd, particularly the messages delivered by the dumb waiter itself, and the delivery of an envelope containing twelve matchsticks. Pinter leaves the play open to interpretation, "wanting his audience to complete his plays, to resolve in their own ways these irresolvable matters". Pinter stated that "between my lack of biographical data about [the characters] and the ambiguity of what they say lies a territory which is not only worthy of exploration but which it is compulsory to explore".

One interpretation is that the play is an absurdist comedy about two men waiting in a universe without meaning or purpose, like Samuel Beckett's Waiting for Godot. "The Dumb Waiter ... achieves, through its unique blend of absurdity, farce, and surface realism, a profoundly moving statement about the modern human condition".

Another interpretation is that the play is a political drama showing how the individual is destroyed by a higher power. "Each of Harold Pinter's [first] four plays ends in the virtual annihilation of an individual ... It is by his bitter dramas of dehumanisation that he implies "the importance of humanity". The religion and society, which have traditionally structured human morality, are, in Pinter's plays, the immoral agents that destroy the individual." Pinter supported the interpretation of The Birthday Party and The Dumb Waiter as "political plays about power and victimisation".

Overall, "it makes much more sense if seen as a play about the dynamics of power and the nature of partnership. Ben and Gus are both victims of some unseen authority and a surrogate married couple quarrelling, testing, talking past each other and raking over old times". It is "a strongly political play about the way a hierarchical society, in pitting the rebel against the conformist, places both at its mercy", but at the same time "a deeply personal play about the destructiveness of betrayal".

"For an audience to gaze into Ben and Gus' closed basement room and overhear their everyday prattle is to gain insight into ... the terrifying vision of the dominant-subservient battle for power, a battle in which societies and individuals engage as a part of daily existence".

== Comedy ==
Although the play uses "the semantic nit-picking that is a standard part of music hall comedy" and is generally considered funny, this is not comedy for its own sake, but "a crucial part of the power-structure".

"The comedy routines in the early plays are maps to the themes and meaning of the plays as a whole ... Our failure to laugh may be an indication that we, the audience, have come to side (or have been taught to side) with the victim rather than the victimiser."

The stories Ben picks out from his newspaper have a similar purpose. He describes an old man, wanting to cross the street, who crawls under a lorry and is run over by it (but it is not clear if the man is killed or not). Ben seems to expect the response, "What an idiot!" but Gus replies "Who advised him to do a thing like that?" which shifts responsibility and suggests the old man was a victim to be pitied. "The eventual split between Ben and Gus is foreshadowed in the very first joke ... By the end of the play, Pinter has trained us to see that the content of the joke-exchange is meaningless: what is important is the structure, and the alliances and antagonisms it reveals."

== Reception ==
Harry Derbyshire reviewed the play in Modern Drama, concluding "Small but perfectly formed, The Dumb Waiter might be considered the best of Harold Pinter's early plays, more consistent than The Birthday Party and sharper than The Caretaker. It combines the classic characteristics of early Pinter – a paucity of information and an atmosphere of menace, working-class small-talk in a claustrophobic setting – with an oblique but palpable political edge and, in so doing, can be seen as containing the germ of Pinter's entire dramatic oeuvre".

Jamie Glover wrote that "The Dumb Waiter is Pinter distilled – the very essence of a writer who tapped into our desire to seek out meaning, confront injustice and assert our individuality."

== Performance history ==
=== Frankfurt ===
The world premiere was in Frankfurt as Der Stumme Diener in February 1959 with Rudolf H. Krieg as Ben and Werner Berndt as Gus.

=== Malibu ===
At Malibu Junior High School sometime in 1979 Emilio Estevez staged this one-act play with young friend and fellow classmate Jeff Lucas. Jeff Lucas played Ben and Emilio Estevez played Gus.

=== London ===
The first performance in London was in January 1960, as part of a double bill with Pinter's first play The Room, at the Hampstead Theatre Club, directed by James Roose-Evans, with Nicholas Selby as Ben and George Tovey as Gus. The production transferred to the Royal Court Theatre in March 1960.

In 1989 a revival at the Theatre Royal Haymarket was directed by Bob Carlton, with Peter Howitt as Ben and Tim Healy as Gus.

In 2007 a revival at the Trafalgar Studios was directed by Harry Burton, with Jason Isaacs as Ben and Lee Evans as Gus.

In 2013 a revival at The Print Room was directed by Jamie Glover, with Clive Wood as Ben and Joe Armstrong as Gus.

In 2019 the play was part of a season of Pinter's one-act plays at the Harold Pinter Theatre, directed by Jamie Lloyd with Danny Dyer as Ben and Martin Freeman as Gus.

In 2020 a 60th anniversary revival at the Hampstead Theatre, directed by Alice Hamilton with Alec Newman as Ben and Shane Zaza as Gus, had an extended run in a COVID secure setting with the audience masked and socially distanced.

=== Oxford ===
In 2004 The Oxford Playhouse presented The Dumb Waiter and Other Pieces by Harold Pinter, directed by Douglas Hodge with Jason Watkins as Ben and Toby Jones as Gus.

=== Liverpool ===
In 2012 a young Mark Pallister took on the role of Gus as original cast member the now famous Lee Evans was unavailable due to his touring schedule.

Mark went on to take further acting roles however it is not known if he is still pursuing an acting career today.

=== Chicago ===
In 2012 The TUTA Theater company presented The Dumb Waiter.

Toronto

In April 2021, the Crane Creations Theatre Company led a play reading of The Dumb Waiter in its monthly play reading event. Hosted by a group of professional theatre artists, the Play Date event aims to spread awareness of playwrights and playwrighting from around the globe.

== Television films and Radio ==
- 1959 – the play was turned down by the BBC, being considered "too obscure" for the TV audience.
- 1981 – the play was produced for BBC Radio starring Roy Kinnear and Bob Hoskins.
- 1985 – Kenneth Ives directed a made-for-TV feature film version of The Dumb Waiter, starring Kenneth Cranham and Colin Blakely, first broadcast by the BBC in July 1985.
- 1987 – Robert Altman directed a made-for-TV feature film version of The Dumb Waiter, starring John Travolta and Tom Conti, filmed in Canada and first televised in the United States on ABC on 12 May 1987, as part of Altman's two-part series entitled Basements; part one is Pinter's first play The Room.

== Film ==
- In Bruges (2008) is a black comedy, crime thriller directed and written by Martin McDonagh which also features two hitmen waiting in confinement for instructions from their mob boss after one of them accidentally killed a young boy during his first assassination. Neither of them understand why they have been sent to Bruges, since they could easily be kept hidden in the UK — the older man, Ken, who has a close relationship with the boss, speculates that they might be here not just to hide from the police but also to kill another person. Ken is calm and enjoys the opportunity to do some sightseeing in Bruges while waiting for their orders, while the younger man, Ray, is emotionally volatile, swinging between boredom and severe guilt at shooting the young boy. While the two men await their orders they argue and one of them bemoans their circumstances. Eventually the boss calls, asks Ken to send Ray out of the room, and then informs him that the trip to Bruges was intended to be a farewell gift for Ray, who he must now assassinate as justice for killing the young boy.
