= Henry Woolf =

English actor (1930–2021)

- Born: 20 January 1930; Homerton, London, England
- Died: 11 November 2021 (aged 91); Saskatoon, Saskatchewan, Canada
- Occupations: Actor, theatre director
- Years active: 1957–2021
- Spouse: Susan Williamson (m. 1968)
- Children: 4

Henry Woolf SOM (20 January 1930 – 11 November 2021) was a British actor, theatre director, and teacher of acting, drama and theatre, who spent the second half of his life in Canada. He was a longtime friend and collaborator of 2005 Nobel Laureate Harold Pinter, having stimulated Pinter to write his first play, The Room (1957), in 1956. Woolf served as a faculty member at the University of Saskatchewan from 1983 to 1997 and as artistic director of Shakespeare on the Saskatchewan from 1991 until 2001.

== Early life ==
Henry Woolf was born to Jewish parents in Homerton, London, on 20 January 1930. He was educated at Hackney Downs School, where he met Harold Pinter; he and Pinter were friends and collaborators for over 60 years. He earned a Bachelor of Arts degree from the University of London and then pursued a postgraduate course in directing at the University of Bristol, before going to the United States, to earn a postgraduate diploma from the College of William and Mary, in Williamsburg, Virginia. Whilst undertaking his directing course at Bristol, he asked his former schoolfriend Harold Pinter if he could write a one-act play for him to produce for his graduation. Pinter said that he had never previously written a play, but would give it a try. Within three days he had written The Room (1957), in which Woolf also originated the role of Mr Kidd.

== Professional career ==
Woolf's film credits include San Ferry Ann (1965), Marat/Sade (1967), Tell Me Lies, The Lion in Winter, Great Catherine (all 1968), The Bed Sitting Room, Alfred the Great (both 1969), The Ruling Class, The Love Pill (both 1972), Galileo, The Rocky Horror Picture Show (both 1975), Rogue Male (1976), The Hound of the Baskervilles (1978), Gorky Park, Superman III (both 1983), and Maid to Order (1987). In All You Need Is Cash (1978), a film by the Rutles (a fictional mock-Beatles band jointly created by Eric Idle and Neil Innes), Woolf played a character named Arthur Sultan, a fictional spoof of Maharishi Mahesh Yogi. His later film appearances include in the 2004 short film Of Note and the 2007 short film smallfilm.

On British television, Woolf played the Man in Harold Pinter's one-man play Monologue (1973); parts in Rutland Weekend Television (1975–1976) and The Sweeney (1975); the Collector in the Doctor Who serial The Sun Makers (1977); served as the host of the 1970s pre-school British educational series Words and Pictures; and performed the role of Doctor Cornelius in the BBC adaptation of Prince Caspian (1989). He also played a role in Steptoe and Son (1974) as local gangster Frankie Barrow, a role which had originated in Steptoe and Son Ride Again (1973), the second film spin-off of the series.

Woolf joined the faculty of the University of Saskatchewan in 1983, was promoted to professor in 1990, also serving as head of its Drama Department, and received the university's Master Teacher Award in 1994, before retiring in 1997, at the Canadian mandatory retirement age of 67. He served as artistic director of the annual summer Shakespeare on the Saskatchewan festival, in Saskatoon, from 1991 until his retirement from that position in 2001. In 2001 he was awarded an honorary Doctor of Laws degree from the University of Saskatchewan.

In March 2003, Woolf directed an all-female production of Twelfth Night, by William Shakespeare, at the University of Winnipeg.

In April 2007, Woolf reprised his roles as Mr Kidd in a production of Pinter's The Room (1957), marking the 50th anniversary of the original production, and as the Man in Pinter's Monologue (1973), both of which occurred at the University of Leeds conference Artist and Citizen: 50 Years of Performing Pinter. He was a member of the Saskatchewan Order of Merit. He received the Saskatchewan Centennial Medal on 17 February 2006 Saskatchewan Centennial Medal.

== Personal life ==
In 1978, with his wife, actress/director Susan Williamson, whom he married in 1968, Woolf moved to Canada where he took a teaching position at the University of Alberta Drama Department. By 1983, they had settled in Saskatoon, Saskatchewan, where they were resident until his death. They had four children.

Woolf died on 11 November 2021, at the age of 91.

== Filmography ==
Year	Title	Role	Notes
1965	A Home of Your Own		
1965	San Ferry Ann	French Van Driver	
1967	Marat/Sade	Father	
1968	Tell Me Lies	Guest #27	Documentary
1968	The Lion in Winter	Strolling Player	
1968	Great Catherine	Egrebyomka	
1969	The Bed Sitting Room	Electricity Man	
1969	Alfred the Great	Wenda	
1970	Figures in a Landscape	Helicopter Pilot	
1972	The Ruling Class	Inmate #1	
1972	Savage Messiah	Gendarme	Uncredited
1972	The Love Pill	Libido	
1972	The Edwardians" Episode 2 Horatio Bottomley	Tommy Cox	
1973	Steptoe and Son Ride Again	Frankie Barrow	
1975	Galileo	Father Clavius	
1975	The Rocky Horror Picture Show	The Transylvanian #18	
1976	Rogue Male	Ticket Seller	TV movie
1977	Joseph Andrews	Mr. Wilson's Companion	
1978	The Hound of the Baskervilles	Shopkeeper	
1983	Superman III	Penguin Man	
1983	Gorky Park	Levin	
1987	Maid to Order	Jailer	
1990	Sylvan Lake Summer	Bastini	
2018	Dancing Day	Mr. Doudie	
