= Harold Pinter Archive =

Literary archive at the British Library

Coordinates: 51.5298°N 0.1280°W

The Harold Pinter Archive in the British Library is the literary archive of Harold Pinter, which Pinter had first placed "on permanent loan" in the British Library in September 1993 and which became a permanent acquisition in December 2007.

== Acquisition ==
On 11 December 2007 the British Library announced that it had purchased Pinter's literary archive for £1.1 million (approx. $2.24 million), augmenting its current "Harold Pinter Archive" of 80 boxes ("Loan 110 A"). It now comprises "over one hundred and fifty boxes of manuscripts, scrapbooks, letters, photographs, programmes, and emails," constituting "an invaluable resource for researchers and scholars of Pinter's work for stage, cinema, and poetry."

== Highlights ==
Among its "highlights" are "an exceedingly perceptive and enormously affectionate run of letters from Samuel Beckett; letters and hand-written manuscripts revealing Pinter's close collaboration with director Joseph Losey; a charming and highly amusing exchange of letters with Philip Larkin; and a draft of Pinter's unpublished autobiographical memoir of his youth, 'The Queen of all the Fairies'," as well as "especially touching" letters from Pinter's "inspirational" Hackney Downs School English teacher and friend, Joseph Brearley.

== BL press release ==
According to the official BL press release, citing its head of Modern Literary Manuscripts, Jamie Andrews, the "extensive collection of correspondence" of "over 12,000 letters" in its expanded Pinter Archive "encompasses the personal, professional and political aspects of the legendary writer, whose career has covered directing, acting, screenwriting, poetry and journalism, as well as his original work for the theatre" and documents Pinter's "key role in post-War theatre and film ... through his extensive correspondence with [other] leading playwrights and literary figures such as Simon Gray, David Hare, David Mamet, Arthur Miller, John Osborne, and [Sir] Tom Stoppard, as well as actors and directors including Sir John Gielgud [corrected] and Sir Peter Hall." This collection also "documents all international performances of Pinter's plays, as well as exchanges with academics that highlight Pinter's engagement with the global scholarly community. There is also extensive material relating to Pinter's commitment to human rights, covering his journalism, poetry and direct action."

== "His Own Domain" ==
From 10 January through 13 April 2008, the British Library exhibited a "small temporary display, 'His Own Domain: Harold Pinter, A Life in Theatre', featuring a range of unique manuscripts, letters, photographs, and sound recordings from the archive charting Pinter's life in the theatre as an actor, director, and writer of some of the most significant and celebrated plays of the twentieth-century."

== British Library responses to Pinter's death ==
After Pinter's death, the British Library updated its official Harold Pinter Archive Blog, posting a memorial notice on 29 December 2008, stating that "Harold was a formidable and generous champion of the Library and its work, and the British Library was immensely proud to have added the Pinter archive to our Manuscript Collections in 2007," and promising that "more detailed tributes" would be appearing there soon. On 6 January 2009, Jamie Andrews, Head of Modern Literary Manuscripts at the British Library and custodian of Pinter's Archive, posted " 'Tender the dead, as you yourself would be tendered...' ", alluding to Hirst's monologue about the faces of the dead in his photograph album from No Man's Land which Pinter had requested that Michael Gambon read at his funeral, which took place on 31 December 2008.

Andrews begins by relating his experience as an invited panellist in the Allied Organization Program arranged by the Harold Pinter Society at the 2008 MLA Convention, on 28 December. Having seen Rupert Goold's production of No Man's Land (with Gambon as Hirst) "just a few days before news of Harold's passing" on the 24th, and "Already carrying the lines and images around" in his head when he "read of the use of Hirst's monologue as part of the funeral," he concludes: "As always with Pinter, there's a certain ambiguity to [Briggs's] swift response 'They're blank, mate, blank. The blank dead'. Personally, I'm with Hirst who, after a trademark 'silence', ripostes quite simply: 'Nonsense'."

== Catalogue ==
Having catalogued the expanded Harold Pinter Archive (Add MS 88880), comprising 504 volumes, the British Library (BL) reopened it to qualified scholars for research in the Modern Literary Manuscripts room, where it is housed, on 2 February 2009. The Harold Pinter Archive catalogue went on-line on Monday 2 February 2009 and became fully visible on Tuesday 3 February.\

== See also ==
- The Lady Antonia Fraser Archive in the British Library
