= Festival (Canadian TV series) season 9 =

Festival
- Season 9
- No. of episodes: 14

Release
- Original network: CBC
- Original release: 30 October 1968 – 26 March 1969

Season chronology
- ← Previous; Season 8 Next → –

The ninth and final season of the Canadian television anthology series Festival broadcast on CBC Television from 30 October 1968 to 26 March 1969. Fourteen new episodes aired this season, in addition to three musical specials which aired in Festival's time-slot, a BBC production of Billy Budd, and a third drama special from the anthology series Cariboo Country.

== Synopsis ==
Season nine plays and literature includes Peter Raby's adaptation of the Alexandre Dumas novel The Three Musketeers, a 1968 Stratford production. Melwyn Breen adapted The Journey of the Fifth Horse for television from Ronald Ribman's off-Broadway play, which in turn was partly based on Ivan Turgenev's novella The Diary of a Superfluous Man, a drama set in 19th century Russia. John Whiting's stage drama A Penny for a Song (1951) was adapted for television by Fletcher Markle. American playwright Frank D. Gilroy's That Summer, That Fall, which had been adapted for Broadway in 1967, is a version of the Hippolytus-Phaedra story. Charles Israel's drama Noises of Paradise is based on a story by Seymour Epstein. In a double bill, Harold Pinter's one-act The Basement aired with James Saunders' one-act Neighbours. Saunders' drama A Scent of Flowers (1966) also aired. Canadian plays included George Salverson's The Write-Off, Munroe Scott's drama Reddick, and Gratien Gélinas' play Yesterday the Children were Dancing.

Music includes an hour of jazz piano by four distinguished pianist-composers, each with their individual styles; American Erroll Garner, American Bill Evans, English-American Marian McPartland, and Canadian Brian Browne. They perform their own compositions and jazz standards by Jerome Kern, Duke Ellington, et al., accompanied by their own accomplished/fellow musicians including Skip Beckwith, Archie Alleyne, Linc Milliman, James Kappes, Eddie Gómez, Arnold Wise, Charles "Ike" Isaacs, Jimmy Smith, and José Mangual Sr.. A "changing of the baton" occurs between Seiji Ozawa and Czechoslovak composer Karel Ančerl, who conducts the Toronto Symphony Orchestra performing tone poem No. 2 Vltava (The Moldau) from Má vlast by Bedřich Smetana, with concertmaster Gerard Kantarjian. Producer Franz Kraemer introduces a University of Toronto concert by Australian soprano Joan Sutherland singing arias by Bizet, Handel, Bononcini, Bellini, Rossini, and Delibes, accompanied by her husband, pianist Richard Bonynge. The French-CBC production of Carl Orff's 1937 secular cantata Carmina Burana is re-aired on the English-CBC network this season on Festival, with Pierre Hétu conducting a 70-piece orchestra, Marcel Laurencelle directing 60 chorus members, pianist/chorister Monik Grenier, dancers with choreography by George Skibine, and children playing nearly 300 roles. Featured are French-Canadian coloratura soprano Colette Boky, tenor René Lacourse, baritone Claude Létourneau, baritone Raymond Pincince, American ballerina Marjorie Tallchief, and Daniel Jackson.

== Notable guest cast ==
- Andrew Allan
- Archie Alleyne
- Karel Ančerl
- James Blendick
- Colette Boky
- Richard Bonynge
- Brian Browne
- Jack Creley
- Don Cullen
- Richard Davidson,
- Jack Duffy
- Bill Evans
- Colin Fox
- Erroll Garner
- Gratien Gélinas
- Eddie Gómez
- Garrick Hagon
- Don Harron
- Kay Hawtrey
- Martha Henry
- Pierre Hétu
- Eric House
- Frances Hyland
- Charles "Ike" Isaacs
- Margot Kidder
- Cec Linder
- José Mangual Sr.
- Marian McPartland
- Belinda Montgomery
- Maggie Morris
- William Needles
- Gerard Parkes
- Henry Ramer
- Chuck Shamata
- Joan Sutherland
- Alfie Scopp
- Marjorie Tallchief
- Henry Tarvainen
- Powys Thomas
- Jess Walton
- Hugh Webster
- Kenneth Welsh
- Chris Wiggins
- Billy Dee Williams
- Erica Yohn
- Trudy Young
- Louis Zorich

== Production ==
Executive producer Robert Allen is the drama supervisor for Festival, in charge of selecting which plays are chosen, and in which order they air. For each script approved, fifty were rejected. As of mid-November 1968, twelve play productions had been chosen for season nine, out of which five are Canadian; The Write-Off, Yesterday the Children were Dancing, Reddick, The Noises of Paradise, and the last, Sister Balonika which had developed out of the Cariboo Country anthology series.

== Episodes ==
Notes:

- "Traveller Without Luggage" from season two was rerun on 26 February 1969.
- Programs which pre-empted Festival include Bob Hope and Public Eye on 27 November 1968, and Christmas specials on 25 December 1968.
- Special programming that aired in the Festival time-slot follows.
  - The 1966 BBC production of Benjamin Britten's opera Billy Budd, based on the 1891 novel by Herman Melville, aired on 20 November 1968 from 8:00 to 10:45 PM.
  - "Edmonton Contest" on 4 December 1968 was a CBC-TV music special hosted by Brian Priestman, with five finalists of the National Performing Artists Competition, organized by the Edmonton Symphony Orchestra.
  - "Sir Ernest Laudamus" / "Enest MacMillan: A Musical Tribute" was a concert held on 20 November at Massey Hall with the Toronto Mendelssohn Choir, Festival Singers of Canada and Toronto Symphony Orchestra conducted by Elmer Iseler, and aired on 18 December 1968.
  - Public Eye aired at 9 PM (1 hour) and a Music Special (10 PM) featuring Canada's National Youth Orchestra, with musicians 14-24 years-old, presented its first television concert, with Franz-Paul Decker conducting 108 musicians, on 8 January 1969.
- Three drama specials developed from the anthology series Cariboo Country, and aired on Festival, including Sister Balonika which was broadcast on 26 March 1969. It was written by Paul St. Pierre, directed by Philip Keatley and filmed on-location in Richmond, and at Hollyburn Film Studios, West Vancouver. It starred Vi Powlan in the lead role as Sister Veronica Anne, whom her students called "Bolanika." Cast included, Christine Green, Merv Campone, Nan Sandy, Susan Ringwood, Lloyd Berry, Jimmy Edwards, Ivor Harries, Diane Wassman, and Robert Clothier.

No. overall	No. in season	Title	Directed by	Written by	Original release date	Ref.
197	1	"The Write-Off"	Rudi Dorn	George Salverson	30 October 1968	
Please add a Plot Summary here, replacing this text. For guidance, see How to write a plot summary. Episode summaries must be expressed in your own words. Do NOT submit content you find from another web site as it is plagiarism and likely a copyright violation, which Wikipedia cannot accept and will be removed or reverted. Superficially modifying copyrighted content or closely paraphrasing it, even if the source is cited, still constitutes a copyright violation. As per Television Plot Manual of Style,^{MOS:TVPLOT} summaries should be about 100 to 200 words in length, and those substantially less than 100 words are most likely to be scrutinized for possible copyright violation. Cast: Gerard Parkes, Cec Linder, Sandra Scott, Maggie Morris, Henry Ramer, William Needles, Trudy Young, and Herbert Goodier.
198	2	"Yesterday the Children were Dancing"	Unknown	Play by : Gratien Gélinas; Translated by : Mavor Moore	6 November 1968	
199	3	"A Scent of Flowers"	Unknown	James Saunders	13 November 1968	
200	4	"Reddick"	Mervyn Rosenzveig	Munroe Scott	11 December 1968	
201	5	"A Penny for a Song"	Norman Campbell	Play by : John Whiting; Adapted by : Fletcher Markle	1 January 1969	
202	6	"Neighbours"	George Bloomfield	James Saunders	15 January 1969	
202	6	"The Basement"	George Bloomfield	Harold Pinter	15 January 1969	
Part 1 (30 minutes). Neighbours: Please add a Plot Summary here, replacing this text. For guidance, see How to write a plot summary and the Television Plot Manual of Style.^{MOS:TVPLOT} Cast: Special guest star Billy Dee Williams (Man) and Frances Hyland (Woman). Part 2 (60 minutes). The Basement: Please add a Plot Summary here, replacing this text. For guidance, see How to write a plot summary and the Television Plot Manual of Style.^{MOS:TVPLOT} Cast: Gerard Parkes as Scott, Joseph Shaw as Law, and Belinda Montgomery cast in the role of Jane.
203	7	"The Jazz Piano"	Unknown	Unknown	22 January 1969	
This hour features jazz piano in four distinctive styles with American swing time pianist/composer Erroll Garner, American impressionist Bill Evans, English-American Marian McPartland, and Canadian Brian Browne. Drawn from individual recording sessions, each of the four artists provide informal discussion on jazz piano in general, and their own style of jazz in particular. Each with their own fellow musicians perform selections.: Browne with bassist Charles Frederick Pearson "Skip" Beckwith and drummer Archie Alleyne perform Happy Little Mothers, Bonnie & Clyde, Girl Talk, and Shiny Silk Stockings.; McPartland with bassist Lincoln "Linc" Milliman and drummer James Kappes perform Jerome Kern's All the Things You Are, a Duke Ellington medley (Cotton Tail, It Don't Mean a Thing, and Satin Doll), and one of her own compositions, Twilight World.; Evans performs The Shadow of Your Smile (solo), and Waltz for Debbie with bassist Eddie Gómez and drummer Arnold Wise.; Erroll Garner with double-bassist Charles "Ike" Isaacs, drummer Gene "Jimmy" Smith, and Puerto Rican percussionist José Mangual Sr. (bongos) perform L-O-V-E, Stella by Starlight, and Gotta Lotta Livin' To Do.; Notes: Produced by John Coulson. Duration, 60 minutes. CBC-TV Music Special preceded by Public Eye (9-10 PM).
204	8	"Noises of Paradise"	Rudi Dorn	Written by : Charles E. Israel; Story by : Seymour Epstein	29 January 1969	
205	9	"Karel Ančerl with Toronto Symphony"	Unknown	Bedřich Smetana	5 February 1969	
With the conductor's baton soon to be relayed from Seiji Ozawa to Czechoslovak composer Karel Ančerl for the 1969–70 season, Ančerl is seen working at rehearsal with the Toronto Symphony Orchestra. The Prague maestro had already accepted the appointment when the Russian invasion of Czechoslovia occurred earlier in August 1968. Ančerl, who had survived the Auschwitz concentration camp, immigrated from Prague to Canada with his family. Ančerl conducts a performance of tone poem No. 2 Vltava (The Moldau) from Má vlast (aka My Fatherland) by Bedřich Smetana, with concertmaster Gerard Kantarjian. Notes: Producer, Franz Kraemer. Settings, Murray Laufer. Taped in Studio 7 at CBC Toronto. Duration, 60 minutes. CBC-TV Music Special preceded by Public Eye (9-10 PM).
206	10	"Joan Sutherland in Concert"	Unknown	Bizet · Handel · Bononcini · Bellini · Rossini · Delibes	12 February 1969	
Producer Franz Kraemer provides an introduction to this one-hour concert, recorded in April 1968. Before an audience at MacMilian Theatre in the Edward Johnson Building, University of Toronto, Australian soprano Joan Sutherland performs arias by French composer Georges Bizet (1838–1875), German-British composer George Frideric Handel (1685–1759), Italian composers Giovanni Bononcini (1670–1747), Vincenzo Bellini (1801–1835), Gioachino Rossini (1792–1868), and French operetta excerpts by Léo Delibes (1836–1891), with piano accompaniment by Richard Bonynge. Notes: CBC-TV Music Special preceded by a Constitutional Conference News Special (9-10 PM).
207	11	"The Journey of the Fifth Horse"	Unknown	Novella by : Ivan Turgenev; Play by : Ronald Ribman; Adapted by : Melwyn Breen	19 February 1969	
208	12	"Carmina Burana"	Jean-Yves Landry	Cantata by : Carl Orff; Choreography by : George Skibine	5 March 1969	
Pierre Hétu conducts a 70-piece orchestra, with choirmaster Marcel Laurencelle directing a 60-member chorus, pianist/chorister Monik Grenier, solo vocalists, 12 dancers with choreography by Russian-American George Skibine, and 8 children performing nearly 300 characters, in a staged presentation of Carl Orff's 1937 secular cantata Carmina Burana. Soloist singers include French-Canadian coloratura soprano Colette Boky, tenor René Lacourse, baritone Claude Létourneau, and baritone Raymond Pincince. Dancers include American ballerina Marjorie Tallchief and Daniel Jackson. The cantata is based on 13th-century Latin poems celebrating life's earthly pleasures written for wandering scholars and discovered among the monks of Benediktbeuern Abbey, Germany. Notes: Originally telecast in color by CBC's French network Société Radio Canada on Les Beaux Dimanches (Beautiful Sundays), 27 October 1968. Duration, 90 minutes. Technical director, Pierre Dupuis. Artistic director, Claude Fortin. Costumes, Marie-Andrée Lainé.
209	13	"That Summer, That Fall"	Mario Prizek	Frank D. Gilroy	12 March 1969	
210	14	"The Three Musketeers"	John Hirsch	Novel by : Alexandre Dumas; Adapted by : Peter Raby	19 March 1969	
This two-hour Festival Special is the Stratford National Theatre Company's 1968 hit stage production of Alexandre Dumas' novel The Three Musketeers, as adapted by Peter Raby. Cast: Kenneth Welsh (D'Artagnan), Martha Henry (Milady de Winter), Leo Ciceri (Cardinal Richelieu), Pat Galloway (Queen Anne), Powys Thomas (Athos), James Blendick (Porthos), Colin Fox (Aramis), Chris Wiggins, Kenneth Wickes, Jonathan White, Mia Anderson, and Max Helpmann. Notes: Producer, David Gardner. Music by Raymond Pannell. Broadcast in color at 8:00 PM EST, it was followed at 10 PM by the NFB drama special, The Best Damn Fiddler from Calabogie to Kaladar (1968), which filled the remainder of the Festival time-slot.

Previous: Season 8	List of Festival episodes	End of Series
