= The Basement (play) =

Play by Harold Pinter

- Written by: Harold Pinter
- Based on: The Compartment (1965)
- Characters: Law, "a man"; Stott, "a man"; Jane, "a girl"
- Genre: Drama
- Setting: a basement flat

Premiere
- Date: 20 January 1967
- Place: Theatre 625, BBC 2

The Basement is a television play (later a stage play) by Harold Pinter. It was written first as a screenplay for a film, then revised for television and broadcast on 20 February 1967.

== Origin: "The Compartment" ==
The Basement is based on "The Compartment" (1965), an unpublished 27-page screenplay (circulated only in typescript) that Pinter wrote in 1963–65 "for a film never made, planned as part of a triple-bill, Project I promoted by Grove Press, New York, with Samuel Beckett's Film [1965] and Eugène Ionesco's The Hard-Boiled Egg" (Baker and Ross 112). Of the three works planned for this trilogy of films, "only Film would be produced, being released in 1965" (112).

According to Pinter's official authorised biographer Michael Billington, also cited by Baker and Ross (112), "Pinter's contribution The Compartment lay dormant until he rewrote it for television as The Basement" (Billington 191).

== Setting ==
The "exterior" and "interior" of "a basement flat" in various seasons and at various times of day and night (Two Plays and a Film Script 91–112).

== Synopsis ==
Two men, (Tim) Law and (Charles) Stott, compete for possession of and dominance over a "basement flat" and their at-times mutual girlfriend, Jane. During the course of the play, they reverse roles with relation to each other, to the ownership or possession of the flat, and to their relationship with or possession of Jane. The changing furnishings of the room reflect their changing roles and who is in power over whom at various points in time. At first Jane appears to be submissive in relation to the men; but as the action develops, at times she appears to dominate each man and both of them. The character relationships between Stott and Law and the basic plot resemble Pinter's prose fiction works "Kullus" and "The Examination".

== Characters ==
- Law, "a man"
- Stott, "a man"
- Jane, "a girl"

== Productions ==
=== Screen ===
The Basement premièred on television, transmitted on 20 February 1967 as part of BBC 2's Theatre 625 series. The episode was directed by Charles Jarrott, with Derek Godfrey cast as Law, Harold Pinter as Stott, and Kika Markham as Jane.

The Canadian CBC Television anthology series Festival aired The Basement along with James Saunders' play Neighbours in a season nine double-bill on 15 January 1969. Both parts were produced and directed by George Bloomfield. The cast included Gerard Parkes as Scott, Joseph Shaw as Law, and Belinda Montgomery as Jane.

=== Stage ===
==== Eastside Playhouse, New York, October 1968 ====
For its theatre debut The Basement, was produced at the Eastside Playhouse in New York City. It premiered in October 1968, as part of a double bill with Pinter's play Tea Party, directed by James Hammerstein. Ted van Griethuysen was cast as Law, James Ray Jane as Stott, and Margo Ann Berdeshevsky as Jane. Stage personnel included Ed Wittstein (scenery), Neil Peter Jampolis (lighting) and Deidre Cartier (costumes).

==== Duchess Theatre, London, September 1970 ====
Hammerstein also directed another stage production at the Duchess Theatre, in London, on 17 September 1970 (The Basement, HaroldPinter.org) with a new cast; Donald Pleasence as Law, Barry Foster as Stott and Stephanie Beacham as Jane.

== See also ==
- Characteristics of Harold Pinter's work

== Works cited ==
Baker, William, and John C. Ross, comps. Harold Pinter: A Bibliographical History. London: The British Library (BL); New Castle, DE: Oak Knoll Press (OKP), 2005. ISBN 0-7123-4885-9 (BL). ISBN 1-58456-156-4 (OKP).

Billington, Michael. Harold Pinter. 1996. London: Faber and Faber, 2007.

Pinter, Harold. The Basement. In Plays: Three. London: Eyre Methuen, 1978. ISBN 0-413-38480-2.

–––. The Lover, Tea Party, The Basement: Two Plays and a Film Script. New York: Grove Press, 1967. (An Evergreen Book E-432).

–––. Tea Party and Other Plays. London: Methuen, 1967. British first ed.; published 15 June 1967. (Baker and Ross 54–55).
