= Richard Widmark =

American actor and producer (1914–2008)

- Widmark as Max Brock, 1973
- Born: Richard Weedt Widmark; December 26, 1914; Sunrise Township, Minnesota, U.S.
- Died: March 24, 2008 (aged 93); Roxbury, Connecticut, U.S.
- Education: Lake Forest College (B.A., 1936)
- Occupations: Actor; producer
- Years active: 1938–2001
- Political party: Democratic
- Spouses: Jean Hazlewood (m. 1942; died 1997); Susan Blanchard (m. 1999)
- Children: 1

Richard Weedt Widmark (December 26, 1914 – March 24, 2008) was an American actor and film producer. For his debut film role as the villainous Tommy Udo in the film noir Kiss of Death (1947), he was nominated for an Academy Award for Best Supporting Actor and won the inaugural Golden Globe Award for Most Promising Newcomer.

Early in his film career, Widmark was typecast in similar villainous or anti-hero roles in films noir, but he later branched out into more heroic leading and supporting roles in Westerns, mainstream dramas, and horror films among others. He also produced several films.

For his contributions to motion pictures, Widmark received a star on the Hollywood Walk of Fame.

== Early life ==
Widmark was born December 26, 1914, in Sunrise Township, Minnesota, the son of Ethel Mae (née Barr) and Carl Henry Widmark. His father, a traveling salesman, was of Swedish descent, and his mother was of English and Scottish ancestry. Widmark grew up in Princeton, Illinois, and lived in Henry, Illinois, for a short time, moving frequently because of his father's work. He earned a Bachelor of Arts in speech at Lake Forest College in 1936, both studying acting and teaching it there after graduating.

Widmark volunteered for the U.S. Army during World War II, but was medically-disqualified due to a perforated ear drum.

== Career ==
=== Radio ===
Widmark made his performing debut as a radio actor in 1938 on Aunt Jenny's Real Life Stories. In 1941 and 1942, he was heard daily on the Mutual Broadcasting System in the title role of the daytime serial Front Page Farrell, introduced each afternoon as "the exciting, unforgettable radio drama... the story of a crack newspaperman and his wife, the story of David and Sally Farrell." Farrell was a top reporter for the Brooklyn Eagle. When the series moved to NBC, Widmark turned the role to Carleton G. Young and Staats Cotsworth.

During the 1940s, Widmark was also heard on such network radio programs as Gang Busters; The Shadow; Inner Sanctum Mysteries; Joyce Jordan, M.D.; Molle Mystery Theater; Suspense; and Ethel and Albert. In 1952, he portrayed Cincinnatus Shryock in an episode of Cavalcade of America titled "Adventure on the Kentucky". He returned to radio drama decades later, performing on CBS Radio Mystery Theater (1974–82), and was also one of the five hosts on Sears Radio Theater (as the Friday "adventure night" host) during 1979-1980.

=== Broadway ===
Widmark appeared on Broadway in 1943 in F. Hugh Herbert's Kiss and Tell and in William Saroyan's Get Away Old Man, directed by George Abbott, which ran for 13 performances. He was in Chicago appearing in a stage production of Dream Girl with June Havoc when 20th Century Fox signed him to a seven-year contract.

=== Film and television ===
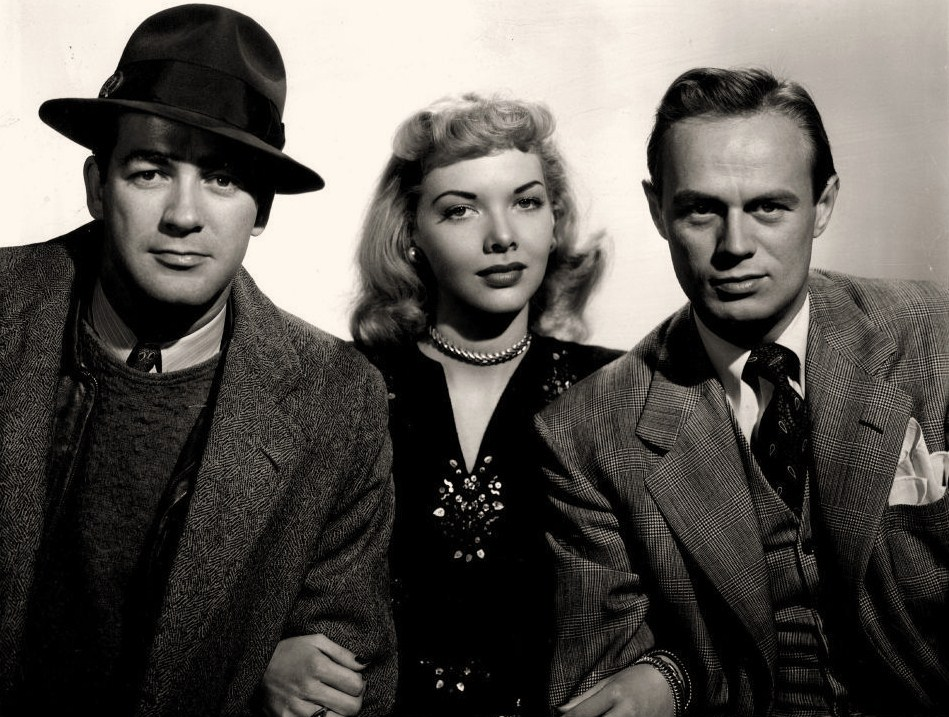
Mark Stevens, Barbara Lawrence and Widmark in The Street with No Name (1948)

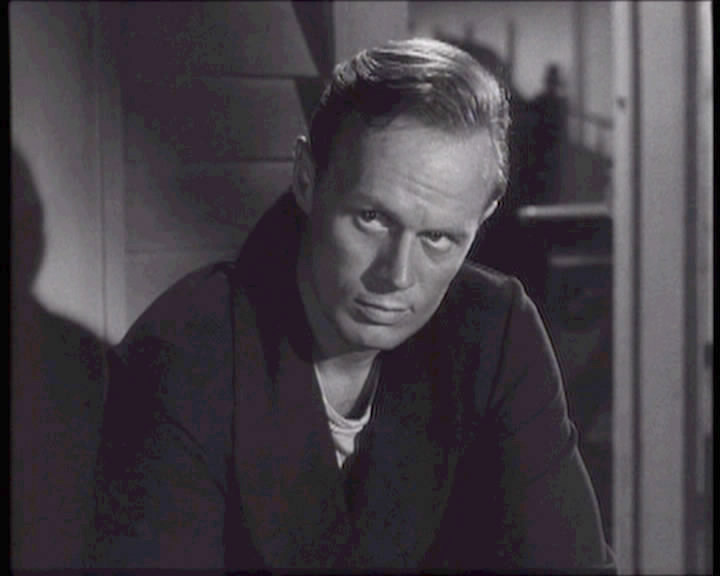
Panic in the Streets (1950)

Widmark's first movie appearance was in the 1947 film noir Kiss of Death, as the giggling, sociopathic villain Tommy Udo. In his most notorious scene, Udo pushed a woman in a wheelchair (played by Mildred Dunnock) down a flight of stairs to her death. Widmark was almost not cast. He said, "The director, Henry Hathaway, didn't want me. I have a high forehead; he thought I looked too intellectual." Hathaway was overruled by studio boss Darryl F. Zanuck. "Hathaway gave me kind of a bad time," recalled Widmark. Nonetheless, Kiss of Death was a commercial and critical success: Widmark won the Golden Globe Award for New Star of the Year - Actor, and was nominated for the Academy Award for Best Supporting Actor for his performance.

Widmark followed Kiss of Death with other villainous performances in the films noir The Street with No Name and Road House, and the Western Yellow Sky (all 1948), the latter film with Gregory Peck and Anne Baxter. Another standout villainous role was in the racial melodrama No Way Out (1950), with Sidney Poitier in his film debut. Widmark and Poitier became good friends and worked in a number of films together in later years.

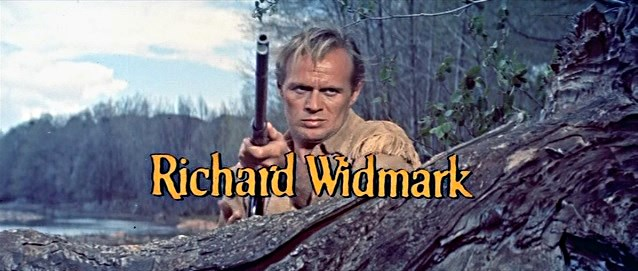
In The Last Wagon (1956)

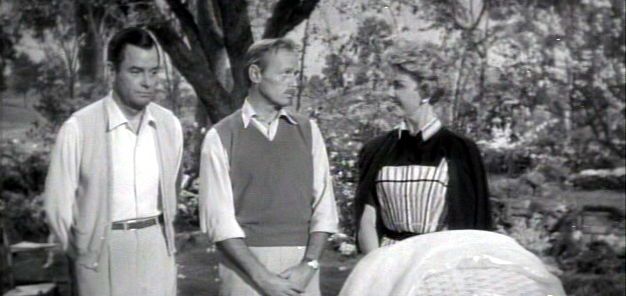
Gig Young, Widmark and Doris Day in The Tunnel of Love (1958)

Widmark played heroic roles in films, including Down to the Sea in Ships, Slattery's Hurricane (both 1949), and Elia Kazan's Panic in the Streets (1950). His role as first mate Lunceford in the whaling movie Down to the Sea in Ships was his first starring role as the principal hero. His next starring role was in the 1951 WWII drama, The Frogmen. This movie is cited by many Navy Seals as the reason they joined the Navy.

He also featured in Halls of Montezuma (1951) and Don't Bother to Knock (1952) (with Marilyn Monroe), and appeared in two films for director Samuel Fuller: the noir Pickup on South Street (1953) and Cold War drama Hell and High Water (1954).

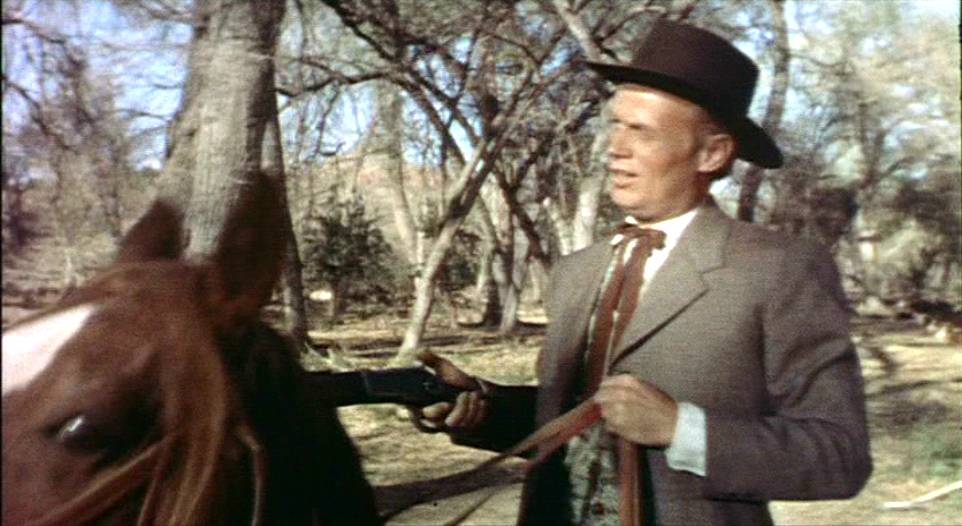
Widmark in Broken Lance (1954)

Widmark was a mystery guest on the CBS quiz show What's My Line? in 1954. The following year, he made a rare foray into comedy on I Love Lucy, portraying himself when a starstruck Lucy trespasses onto his property to steal a souvenir. Widmark finds Lucy sprawled out on his living room floor underneath a bearskin rug.

Widmark continued to appear in a number of successful films, including The Tunnel of Love (1959) with Doris Day, the Westerns Warlock (also 1959) with Henry Fonda, as Jim Bowie in John Wayne's The Alamo (1960), the courtroom drama Judgment at Nuremberg (1961), and reuniting with Sidney Poitier in the adventure The Long Ships (1964).

Widmark produced and starred in the films Time Limit (1957), The Secret Ways (1961) — based on a novel by Alistair MacLean, which Widmark also directed (uncredited) due to clashes with original director Phil Karlson's proposed tongue-in-cheek direction of the screenplay — and The Bedford Incident (1965), his third film with Sidney Poitier and loosely based on the Herman Melville novel Moby Dick.

Widmark received an Emmy Award nomination for his performance as Paul Roudebush, the president of the United States, in the TV movie Vanished! (1971), a Fletcher Knebel political thriller. In 1972, he reprised his detective role from Don Siegel's Madigan (1968) with six 90-minute episodes on the NBC Wednesday Mystery Movie. He performed in a mini-series about Benjamin Franklin, broadcast in 1974, which was a unique experiment of four 90-minute dramas, each with a different actor impersonating Franklin: Widmark, Beau Bridges, Eddie Albert, Melvyn Douglas, and Willie Aames who portrayed Franklin at age 12. The series won a Peabody Award and five Emmys.

Widmark began to drift into supporting roles, though he still played the occasional lead, for instance in the 1976 British-West German film To the Devil a Daughter. He was part of an all-star cast in the 1974 film Murder on the Orient Express (playing the murder victim), the 1977 film Rollercoaster (as an FBI agent), and The Swarm (1978). He had a prominent supporting role in Michael Crichton's Coma (1978) with Geneviève Bujold and Michael Douglas, and portrayed Al Sieber in the TV movie Mr. Horn (1979).

Widmark continued to appear in a number of films during the 1980s, again with Sidney Poitier who directed him in the comedy Hanky Panky (1982), with Gene Wilder. He also featured in the political thriller Who Dares Wins (1982), and Against All Odds (1984), with Jeff Bridges and James Woods. His last television role was in the critically acclaimed TNT adaptation of Cold Sassy Tree (1989) alongside Faye Dunaway.

In all, Widmark appeared in more than 60 films, making his final appearance in the 1991 drama True Colors.

In an interview with Michael Shelden in 2002, Widmark complained that "movie-making has lost a lot of its magic". He thought it had become "mostly a mechanical process...All they want to do is move the camera around like it was on a rollercoaster. A great director like John Ford knew how to handle it. Ford didn't move the camera, he moved the people".

== Personal life ==
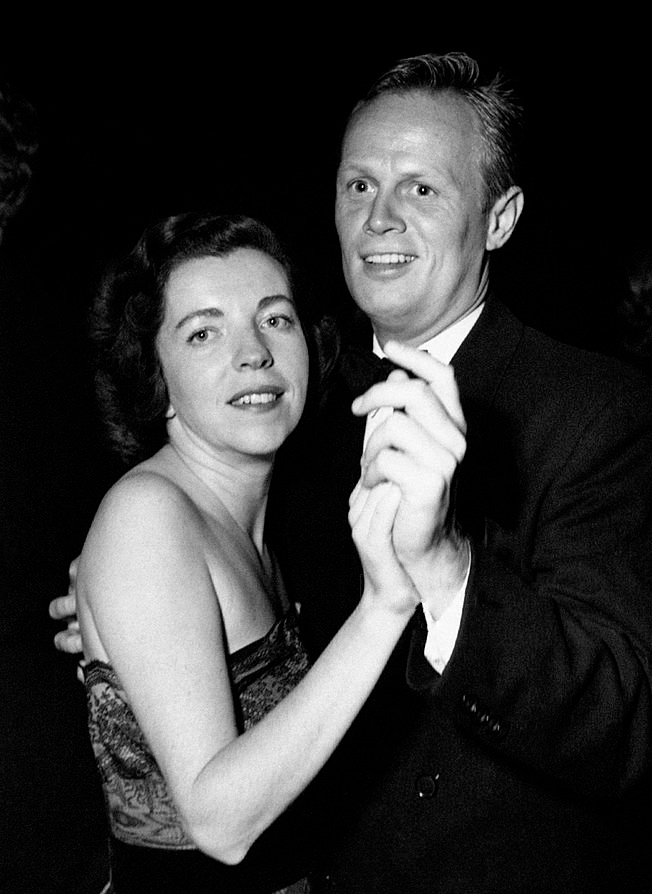
Richard Widmark with his first wife, Jean Hazlewood, in the 1950s

Widmark was married to screenwriter Ora Jean Hazlewood for 55 years from 1942 until her death from Alzheimer's disease in March 1997; they met while attending Lake Forest College. The couple had one daughter, Anne Heath Widmark, an artist and author who was married to Baseball Hall of Famer Sandy Koufax from 1969 to 1982. Widmark named his film production company Heath Productions, after his daughter.

In 1999, Widmark remarried to socialite Susan Blanchard, the daughter of Dorothy Hammerstein and stepdaughter of Oscar Hammerstein II; she had been Henry Fonda's third wife.

=== Political views ===
Widmark was a lifelong member of the Democratic Party.

Despite having spent a substantial part of his career appearing in gun-toting roles such as cowboys, police officers, gangsters and soldiers, Widmark personally disliked firearms and was involved in several gun-control initiatives. In 1976, he stated:

I know I've made kind of a half-assed career out of violence, but I abhor violence. I am an ardent supporter of gun control. It seems incredible to me that the United States is the only civilized nation that does not put some effective control on guns.

== Death ==
Widmark died after a long illness on March 24, 2008, at his home in Roxbury, Connecticut, at the age of 93. His failing health in his final years was aggravated by a fall he suffered in 2007. He was buried at Roxbury Center Cemetery.

== Legacy ==
For his contributions to the motion picture industry, Widmark has a star on the Hollywood Walk of Fame at 6800 Hollywood Boulevard. In 2002, he was inducted into the Western Performers Hall of Fame at the National Cowboy & Western Heritage Museum in Oklahoma City.

In the 1960s, future Philippine President Rodrigo Duterte listed Widmark as his "idol" in his high school yearbook.

== Filmography ==
=== Film ===
Year	Title	Role	Notes
1947	Kiss of Death	Tommy Udo	
1948	The Street with No Name	Alec Stiles	
1948	Road House	Jefferson T. "Jefty" Robbins	
1948	Yellow Sky	Dude	
1949	Down to the Sea in Ships	First Mate Dan Lunceford	
1949	Slattery's Hurricane	Lt. Willard Francis Slattery	
1950	Night and the City	Harry Fabian	
1950	Panic in the Streets	LCDR. Clinton "Clint" Reed M.D.	
1950	No Way Out	Ray Biddle	
1951	Halls of Montezuma	Lt. Anderson	
1951	The Frogmen	LCDR. John Lawrence	
1952	Red Skies of Montana	Cliff Mason	
1952	Don't Bother to Knock	Jed Towers	
1952	O. Henry's Full House	Johnny Kernan	Segment: "The Clarion Call"
1952	My Pal Gus	Dave Jennings	
1953	Destination Gobi	CPO Samuel T. McHale	
1953	Pickup on South Street	Skip McCoy	
1953	Take the High Ground!	Sgt. Thorne Ryan	
1954	Hell and High Water	Capt. Adam Jones	
1954	Garden of Evil	Fiske	
1954	Broken Lance	Ben Devereaux	
1955	A Prize of Gold	Sergeant Joe Lawrence	
1955	The Cobweb	Dr. Stewart "Mac" McIver	
1956	Backlash	Jim Slater	
1956	Run for the Sun	Michael "Mike" Latimer	
1956	The Last Wagon	Comanche Jonathan Todd	
1957	Saint Joan	The Dauphin, Charles VII	
1957	Time Limit	Col. William Edwards	Also producer
1958	The Law and Jake Wade	Clint Hollister	
1958	The Tunnel of Love	August "Augie" Poole	
1959	The Trap	Ralph Anderson	
1959	Warlock	Johnny Gannon	
1960	The Alamo	Colonel Jim Bowie	
1961	The Secret Ways	Michael Reynolds	Also producer; uncredited director
1961	Two Rode Together	First Lt. Jim Gary	
1961	Judgment at Nuremberg	Col. Tad Lawson	
1962	How the West Was Won	Mike King	
1964	The Long Ships	Rolfe	
1964	Flight from Ashiya	Lt. Col. Glenn Stevenson	
1964	Cheyenne Autumn	Capt. Thomas Archer	
1965	The Bedford Incident	CPT. Eric Finlander	Also producer
1966	Alvarez Kelly	Col. Tom Rossiter	
1967	The Way West	Lije Evans	
1968	Madigan	Det. Daniel Madigan	
1969	Death of a Gunfighter	Marshal Frank Patch	
1969	A Talent for Loving	Major Patten	
1970	The Moonshine War	Dr. Emmett Taulbee	
1972	When the Legends Die	Red Dillon	
1974	Murder on the Orient Express	Samuel Ratchett / Lanfranco Cassetti	
1975	The Last Day	Will Spence	
1976	To the Devil a Daughter	John Verney	
1976	The Sell Out	Sam Lucas	
1977	Twilight's Last Gleaming	Gen. Martin MacKenzie	
1977	The Domino Principle	Tagge	
1977	Rollercoaster	Agent Hoyt	
1978	Coma	Dr. Harris	
1978	The Swarm	Gen. Slater	
1979	Bear Island	Otto Gerran	
1982	National Lampoon Goes to the Movies	Stan Nagurski	Segment: "Municipalians"
1982	Hanky Panky	Ransom	
1982	Who Dares Wins	U.S. Secretary of State Arthur Currie	
1984	Against All Odds	Ben Caxton	
1991	True Colors	Sen. James Stiles	

=== Television ===
Year	Title	Role	Notes
1955	I Love Lucy	Himself	Episode: "The Tour"
1972–73	Madigan	Sgt. Dan Madigan	6 episodes

==== TV films, miniseries, and specials ====
Year	Title	Role	Notes
1971	Vanished	President Paul Roudebush	
1973	Brock's Last Case	Lieutenant Max Brock	
1974–75	The Lives of Benjamin Franklin	Benjamin Franklin	
1975	The Last Day	Will Spence	
1979	Mr. Horn	Al Sieber	
1980	All God's Children	Judge Parke Denison	
1981	A Whale for the Killing	Tom Goodenough	
1985	Blackout	Joe Steiner	
1987	A Gathering of Old Men	Sheriff Mapes	
1988	Once Upon a Texas Train	Captain Owen Hayes	
1989	Cold Sassy Tree	Enoch Rucker Blakeslee	
1992	Lincoln	Ward Hill Lamon (voice)	Documentary

== Stage appearances ==
Year	Title	Role	Venue	Notes
1943	Get Away Old Man	Harry Bird	Cort Theatre, New York	
1943–45	Kiss and Tell	Lt. Lenny Archer	Biltmore Theatre, New York	
1943–45	Kiss and Tell	Lt. Lenny Archer	Bijou Theatre, New York	
1944–45	Trio	Ray MacKenzie	Belasco Theatre, New York	
1945	Kiss Them for Me	Crewson	Belasco Theatre, New York	
1945	Kiss Them for Me	Crewson	Fulton Theatre, New York	
1945–46	Dunnigan's Daughter	Jim Baird	John Golden Theatre, New York	
1946–47	Dream Girl	Clark Redfield	U.S. tour	
1947	Joan of Lorraine	Jimmy Masters	Ogunquit Playhouse, Ogunquit	

== Radio appearances ==
Year	Program	Episode/source
1938	Aunt Jenny's Real Life Stories	
1941–42	Front Page Farrell	
1946	Mollé Mystery Theatre	"The Creeper"
1952	Cavalcade of America	"Adventure on the Kentucky"
1952	Theatre Guild on the Air	Liliom
1953	Theatre Guild on the Air	1984
1953	Suspense	Othello (Parts 1 and 2)
1979–80	Sears Radio Theater	Host - Adventure Night
1979–82	CBS Radio Mystery Theater	

Widmark also appeared on various times on Gang Busters; The Shadow; Inner Sanctum Mysteries; Joyce Jordan, M.D.; Suspense; and Ethel and Albert.
