= Jazz Canada =

Canadian music television series

- Genre: Music
- Presented by: Guido Basso
- Country of origin: Canada
- Original language: English
- No. of seasons: 1

Production
- Producers: Halifax: Eleanor Lindo; Toronto: Jack Budgell; Bob Gibbons; Ain Soodor; Vancouver: Patsy MacDonald
- Running time: 60 minutes

Original release
- Network: CBC Television
- Release: 29 February – 3 August 1980

Jazz Canada is a Canadian music television program that aired on CBC Television in 1980.

== Premise ==
This series featured jazz concerts as produced in studio at Halifax, Toronto and Vancouver. Featured artists included

== Production ==
Jim Guthro co-ordinated the production among the CBC regional centres involved. Episodes were taped as live performances in sparse studio settings with the intent to highlight the performances themselves. Guest artists featuring during the series included Tommy Banks Orchestra, Ed Bickert, Brian Browne, Jim Galloway Band, Sonny Greenwich, Paul Horn, Moe Koffman Quintet, Fraser MacPherson, Manteca, Rob McConnell and the Boss Brass, Big Miller, Nimmons 'n' Nine Plus Six, Doug Riley and the Don Thompson Trio.

== Scheduling ==
This hour-long series was broadcast Fridays at 11:45 p.m. (Eastern) from 29 February to 18 April 1980. From 6 July 1980, it moved to a Sunday 4:00 p.m. time slot until its final episode was broadcast on 3 August 1980.
