= Diplomatic Passport =

Diplomatic Passport may refer to:

- Diplomatic passport, a passport used by diplomats
- Diplomatic Passport (TV series), a Canadian interview television series
- Diplomatic Passport (film), a 1954 British thriller film
