= Pick of the Week =

Pick of the Week may refer to:

- Pick of the Week (radio), a British BBC radio programme broadcast from 1959
- Pick of the Week (TV series), a Canadian television series broadcast 1967–1969

== See also ==
- Pick of the Pops, a BBC radio programme broadcast from 1955
