= Susan Blanchard =

Susan Blanchard may refer to:

- Susan Blanchard (socialite) (born 1928), who married actors Henry Fonda, Michael Wager, and Richard Widmark
- Susan Blanchard (actress) (born 1944), American actress known for role on All My Children in the 1970s
- Blanchard Ryan (Susan Blanchard Ryan, born 1967), American actress who starred in the 2003 film Open Water
