= Dorothy Hammerstein =

Australian-born American interior designer and decorator (1899–1987)

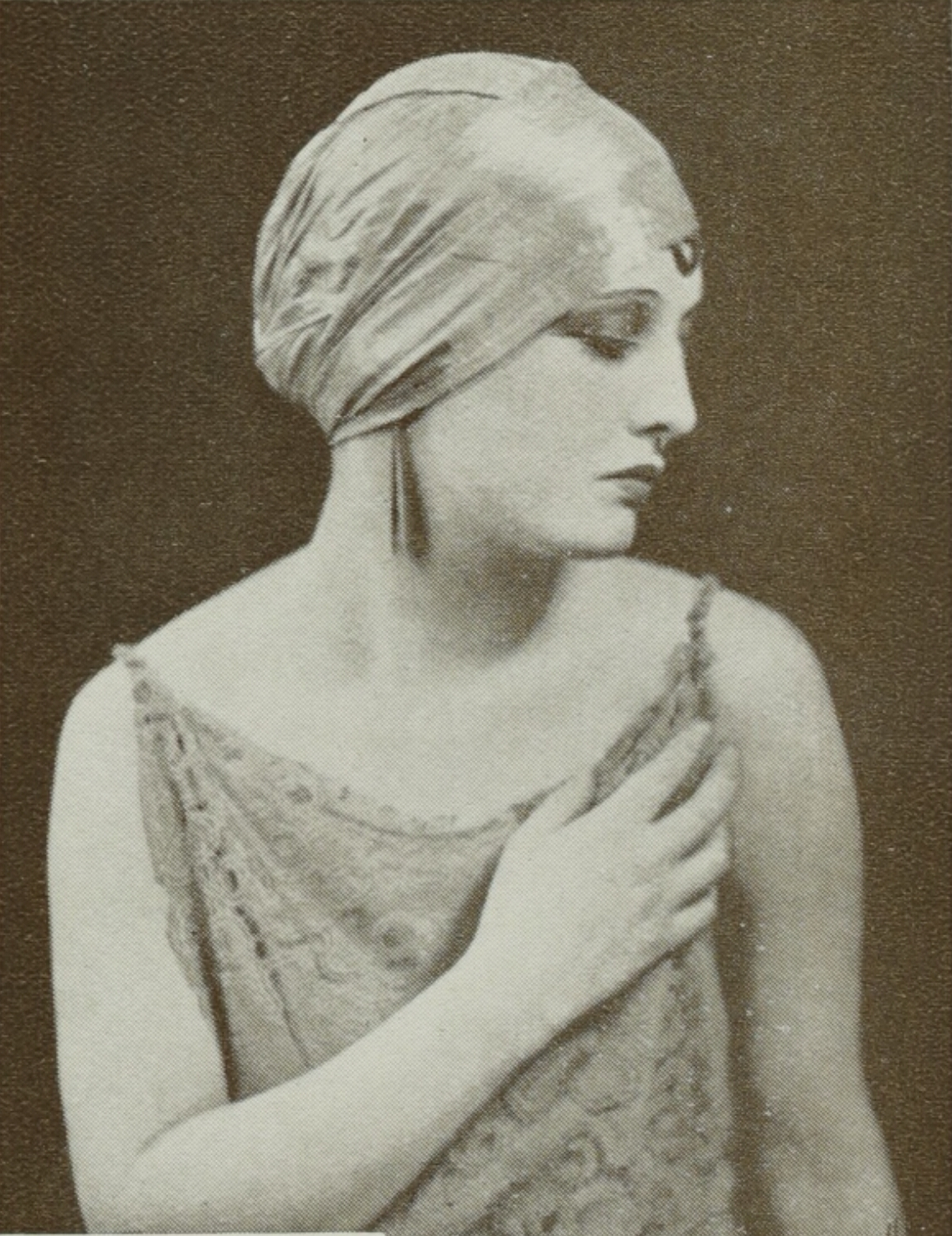
- Born: Dorothy Marian Kiaora Blanchard; 7 June 1899; Launceston, Tasmania, Australia
- Died: 3 August 1987 (aged 88); New York City, U.S.
- Occupations: Interior designer; decorator
- Spouses: William Thomas Meikle (m. 1916; div. 1922) Henry Jacobson (m. 1925; div. 1929) Oscar Hammerstein II (m. 1929; died 1960)
- Children: 3, including Susan Blanchard and James Hammerstein

Dorothy Hammerstein (born Dorothy Marian Kiaora Blanchard; 7 June 1899 – 3 August 1987) was an Australian-born American interior designer and decorator. She was the second wife of the lyricist Oscar Hammerstein II.

== Early life ==
Dorothy Marian Kiaora Blanchard was born to Henry James Blanchard (1862–1931), a New Zealand-born master mariner. Her second middle name, Kiaora, is a traditional greeting in the Māori language of New Zealand. Her mother was Marion (née Parmenter; 1867–1946), born in Scotland. There were four other daughters of the marriage. Henry Blanchard became a ship's pilot on Melbourne's Port Phillip Bay, and they resided in the bayside suburb of Williamstown, in a large house called Mandalay.

On 1 July 1916, aged 17, Blanchard married Lieutenant (later Captain) William Thomas Meikle (born Adelaide, South Australia 14 April 1886), an Australian Infantry Force Officer repatriated from Gallipoli following illness. He subsequently returned to fight in the A.I.F. in France. Meikle remained in the AIF, administering war graves in France and Belgium until 1921, resigning to join the Imperial War Graves Commission where he was superintendent until 1926. Blanchard filed for divorce from Meikle in August 1922, alleging desertion.

Blanchard left Melbourne for London on 22 August 1922 in search of an acting career. Not being successful there, she went to New York, where she joined the cast of André Charlot's London Revue of 1924, an English musical starring Beatrice Lillie and Gertrude Lawrence. She toured the United States and Canada for a year as Lillie's understudy.

In 1925, Blanchard married Henry Jacobson, a New York businessman, with whom she had two children, Henry Jacobson and Susan Blanchard, who would later marry actors Henry Fonda, Michael Wager, and Richard Widmark. While still married to Jacobson, albeit unhappily, Dorothy met Oscar Hammerstein II, whose own marriage was also unhappy. They fell in love, and divorced their spouses to marry in 1929. Oscar also had two children from his first marriage: William Hammerstein and Alice Mathias. His marriage to Dorothy lasted until his death in 1960. They had a son together, James Hammerstein.

== Professional career ==
Between the 1930s and the 1950s Hammerstein operated Dorothy Hammerstein Inc, a high-profile interior design business, with clients on both coasts of the United States.

In 1949, along with her husband and the novelists Pearl S. Buck and James A. Michener, Hammerstein was a founder of Welcome House, an organization that facilitates the adoption of children of American and Asian parents.

== Later life ==
Hammerstein was actively involved with the Dance Theatre of Harlem from its inception in 1969 until her death, both as a board member and as a member of its national advisory board.

Hammerstein died in her sleep on 3 August 1987. She was survived by her three children, two stepchildren, ten grandchildren and five great-grandchildren.
