= Barry Foster (actor) =

English actor (1927–2002)

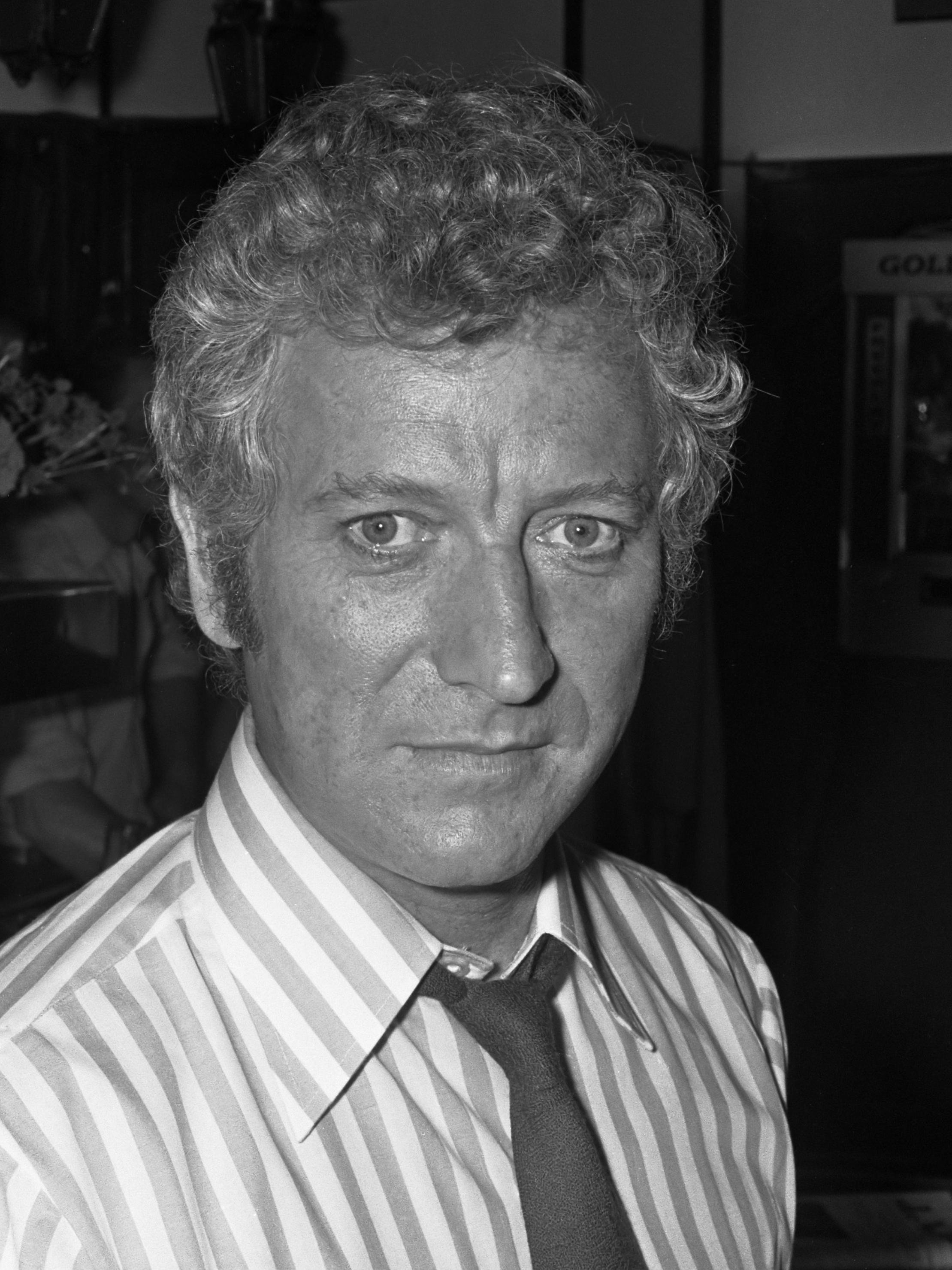
- Foster in 1972
- Born: John Barry Foster; 21 August 1927; Beeston, Nottinghamshire, England
- Died: 11 February 2002 (aged 74); Guildford, Surrey, England
- Education: Royal Central School of Speech and Drama
- Occupation: Actor
- Years active: 1954–2002
- Spouse: Judith Shergold (m. 1955)
- Children: 3; including Joanna Foster

John Barry Foster (21 August 1927 – 11 February 2002) was an English actor who had an extensive career in film, radio, stage and television over almost 50 years. He was best known for portraying the title character in the British crime series Van der Valk (1972–1973, 1977, 1991–1992) and Bob Rusk in Alfred Hitchcock's Frenzy (1972).

== Early life ==
Foster was born on 21 August 1927 in Beeston, Nottinghamshire, the son of a toolsetter. His family moved to Hayes, Middlesex, when he was a few months old. He received his formal education at Southall County School.

After leaving school, Foster trained as a plastics organic chemist at the local EMI Central Research Laboratories, while unsuccessfully submitting ideas to advertising agencies. Having been "called to the Colours" under the National Service Act 1948, Foster served with the Royal Air Force.

He subsequently trained as an actor, having won a scholarship to train at the Central School of Speech and Drama in London. He arrived there aged 20 and soon acquired the affectionate nickname "Fozza", which stayed with him for the rest of his life. It was at the Central School that he became friends with actor and playwright Harold Pinter. Foster appeared on stage in three of Pinter's plays: The Basement, The Tea Party and A Slight Ache, in 1987.

== Career ==
Foster's professional stage debut came in 1952 as Lorenzo in The Merchant of Venice in County Cork. In 1955, he made his London stage debut as the Electrician in The Night of the Ball at the New Theatre (now the Noël Coward Theatre). His first film role was in The Battle of the River Plate (1956), as part of the crew of HMS Exeter, in which he played Able Seaman Roper. Over the next decade and a half, he performed in Joseph Losey's King and Country (1964), The Family Way (1966), Robbery (1967), Inspector Clouseau (1968) and Battle of Britain (1969). He had a regular role on the TV series The Troubleshooters (1965). In 1970, he played a Fenian paramilitary leader in David Lean's epic film Ryan's Daughter.

In 1972 Foster played two roles, on opposite sides of the law. The first was the cynical Dutch detective Van der Valk, a role he played, on and off, until 1992. The second was a serial murderer in Alfred Hitchcock's film Frenzy. Frenzy was Hitchcock's next-to-last film, made towards the end of an acclaimed and commercially highly successful career, and caused controversy for the scene in which Foster was required to simulate a rape and a murder, reportedly driven by Hitchcock's desire to prove that he was still relevant as a director in a more permissive age. Michael Caine had previously rejected the role and criticised the nature of the film.

Shortly after the third series of Van der Valk, Foster took on the role of Sherlock Holmes in a series of BBC radio plays in 1978. He recorded 13 episodes of the Holmes canon, with David Buck as Dr Watson. Also on BBC Radio, he later voiced other detectives such as Sergeant Cribb and Maigret. Foster was seen on BBC television in Fall of Eagles (1974, in the role of Kaiser Wilhelm II) and as the condescending chief of British Intelligence in the adaptation of the John le Carré novel Smiley's People (1982). During this time, Foster appeared in the films Sweeney! (1977), spun off from the TV series; The Wild Geese (1978); Merchant Ivory's Heat and Dust (1983); The Whistle Blower (1986); and Maurice (1987).

From the 1990s, Foster mainly performed on stage. He took on the role of Inspector Goole in J.B. Priestley's An Inspector Calls in a production directed by Stephen Daldry. In 2000, he starred as Prospero in The Tempest, directed by Julia Stafford Northcote at Stafford Castle. From 2001 to 2002, he performed in a run of Yasmina Reza's stage play 'Art' in the West End of London.

== Personal life ==
Foster married Judith Shergold in 1955 in Birkenhead, the marriage producing two daughters and a son. After Foster's death, a trust was set up, titled the Barry Foster Memorial Award, to help disabled children become involved in the theatre. Foster was a talented amateur pianist, with a penchant for jazz music.

== Death ==
Foster became ill while appearing in a play in the West End on 8 February 2002 and was taken to hospital. He died of a heart attack aged 74 on 11 February 2002 at the Royal Surrey County Hospital in Guildford, Surrey, not far from where he lived.

A funeral service was held for him on 21 February 2002 at St Stephen's Church at the village of Shottermill, near Haslemere. His body was cremated at Guildford Crematorium, and his ashes divided, part being interred at St Stephen's and the remainder being interred in France.

== Filmography ==
| Year | Title | Role | Notes |
|---|---|---|---|
| 1956 | The Baby and the Battleship | First Sailor at Dance | Uncredited |
| 1956 | The Battle of the River Plate | Bill Roper | Uncredited |
| 1957 | Yangtse Incident: The Story of H.M.S. Amethyst | PO McCarthy RN | |
| 1957 | High Flight | Wilcox | |
| 1958 | Dunkirk | Don R | |
| 1958 | Sea Fury | Vincent | |
| 1958 | Sea of Sand | Corporal Mathieson | |
| 1959 | Four Desperate Men | Charlie Patterson | Uncredited |
| 1960 | Surprise Package | US Marshal | |
| 1964 | King and Country | Lieutenant Webb | |
| 1966 | The Family Way | Joe Thompson | |
| 1967 | Robbery | Frank | |
| 1968 | Inspector Clouseau | Addison Steele | |
| 1968 | Twisted Nerve | Gerry Henderson | |
| 1969 | The Guru | Chris | |
| 1969 | Battle of Britain | Squadron Leader Edwards | |
| 1970 | Ryan's Daughter | Tim O'Leary | |
| 1972 | Frenzy | Robert Rusk | |
| 1974 | A Quiet Day in Belfast | John Slattery | |
| 1975 | The Last Word | Edward | |
| 1977 | Sweeney! | Elliott McQueen | |
| 1977 | The Three Hostages | Richard Hannay | |
| 1978 | The Wild Geese | Thomas Balfour | |
| 1980 | Danger on Dartmoor | Green | |
| 1983 | Heat and Dust | Major Minnies | |
| 1984 | To Catch a King | Max Winter | |
| 1986 | The Whistle Blower | Charles Grieg | |
| 1987 | Three Kinds of Heat | Norris | |
| 1987 | Maurice | Dean Cornwallis | |
| 1990 | King of the Wind | Mr. Williams | |
| 2000 | Rancid Aluminium | Doctor | |

== Television ==
| Year | Title | Role | Notes |
|---|---|---|---|
| 1956-1959 | BBC Sunday Night Theatre | Various | 5 episodes |
| 1958-1963 | ITV Television Playhouse | Various | 6 episodes |
| 1959 | Armchair Theatre | Edgar Malone | Episode: "Worm in the Bud" |
| 1959-1967 | ITV Play of the Week | Various | 4 episodes |
| 1960-1962 | BBC Sunday-Night Play | Matt/Philip Dugan | 2 episodes |
| 1961 | Sir Francis Drake | Tom Brewster | Episode: "The Lost Colony of Virginia" |
| 1962 | The Edgar Wallace Mystery Theater | Constable Dave Hollis | Episode: "Playback" |
| 1963 | Suspense | Rusty Green | Episode: "Last Race, Ginger Gentleman" |
| 1963 | Espionage | Gerry Paynter | Episode: "The Gentle Spies" |
| 1963-1968 | Love Story | Rodney Webb/Kelly | 2 episodes |
| 1964 | Thursday Theatre | Jeff Smith | Episode: "Same Sky" |
| 1965 | The Wednesday Play | Various | 3 episodes |
| 1965 | The Troubleshooters | Robert Driscoll | 10 episodes |
| 1966 | Drama 61-67 | Monty Mays | Episode: "Drama '66: A Hero of Modern Industry" |
| 1969 | Chronicle | Thomas Becket | Episode: "Henry" |
| 1971 | Doomwatch | Dr. Carson | Episode: "The Iron Doctor" |
| 1971 | Public Eye | Gerald Gurney-Smith | Episode: "A Mug Named Frank" |
| 1972 | Omnibus | John Stanley | Episode: "Actor, I Said" |
| 1972 | Thirty-Minute Theatre | Phil | Episode: "The Sit In" |
| 1972-1992 | Van der Valk | Simon 'Piet' Van der Valk | |
| 1973 | ITV Saturday Night Theatre | John Dixon | Episode: "Pleased to Meet You" |
| 1973 | Divorce His, Divorce Hers | Donald Trenton | Television films |
| 1974 | Fall of Eagles | Kaiser William II | 7 episodes |
| 1976-1982 | BBC2 Playhouse | Various | 3 episodes |
| 1982 | Smiley's People | Saul Enderby | 2 episodes |
| 1982 | A Woman Called Golda | Orde Wingate | Television film |
| 1984 | After Pilkington | Derek Newhouse | Television film |
| 1985 | Bergerac | Howard Bailey | Episode: "The Last Interview" |
| 1986 | Hotel du Lac | David Simmonds | Television film |
| 1986-1987 | Screen Two | Derek/David Simmonds | 2 episodes |
| 1989 | Inspector Morse | Sir Alexander Reece | Episode: "The Last Enemy" |
| 1995 | The Wind in the Willows | Boatman | Television film |
| 1999 | Roger Roger | Pieter Eugene | 6 episodes |

== Radio ==
- The Quarry (1965) – Douglas Shemley in BBC Radio drama
- World from Rough Stones trilogy (1974) - Lord John, with Nerys Hughes as Nora, Hugh Ross as Walter and Carole Boyd as Arabella, in BBC Radio 4 Drama production of novels by Malcolm Macdonald
- Sherlock Holmes (1978) – Sherlock Holmes, with David Buck as Dr. Watson
- The George Cragge series (1995-1999) – DCI Frank Jefferson
- A Fall of Moondust (1981) – Chief Engineer Jim Lawrence
- Space Force (1984–85) – Saxon Berry
- Swing Swing Together (1987) – Sergeant Cribb in BBC Radio 4 Saturday Night Theatre dramatisation of novel by Peter Lovesey

== Sources ==
- BFI Film & TV Database
