= James Saunders (playwright) =

English playwright (1925–2004)

- Born: 8 January 1925; Islington, London
- Died: January 29, 2004 (aged 79)
- Occupation: Playwright

James Saunders (8 January 1925 – 29 January 2004) was a prolific English playwright born in Islington, London. His early plays led to him being considered one of the leading British exponents of the Theatre of the Absurd.

== Personal life ==
He was educated at Wembley County Grammar School, which now forms part of Alperton Community School and Southampton University. He married Audrey Cross.

== Plays ==
His play Next Time I'll Sing To You, written in 1962, was staged in the West End starring Michael Caine, Barry Foster and Liz Fraser, at the New Arts and the Criterion Theatre in 1963. It gained him the 1963 Evening Standard award (with Charles Wood) for "Most Promising Playwright". The play was also produced in New York the same year.

Saunders' play Neighbours was first performed at Questors Theatre, Ealing in October of 1964, and later appeared professionally at Hampstead Theatre Club on 8 May 1967. It was televised in Canada on the CBC Television anthology series Festival, which also aired Harold Pinter's play The Basement in a season nine double-bill on 15 January 1969. Both parts were produced and directed by George Bloomfield. The cast included special guest star Billy Dee Williams opposite Frances Hyland.

In 1975 he completed John Vanbrugh's four-act fragment, A Journey to London, a play that had been sentimentalised by Colley Cibber in 1728 as The Provoked Husband. Saunders' version was first staged in Greenwich and successfully revived at the Orange Tree Theatre in 1986.

Bodies, commissioned and first staged by Sam Walters at the Orange Tree in 1977, was revived by Robin Lefévre at the Hampstead Theatre in February 1978, and given a West End transfer in April 1979, starring Dinsdale Landen, Gwen Watford, David Burke and Angela Down.

== Television ==
Saunders' television work included Watch Me I'm a Bird (1964), and the BBC sitcom Bloomers (1979), starring Richard Beckinsale (in the year that he died) playing an unsuccessful actor working in a flower shop. Beckinsale's co-star was Anna Calder-Marshall.

== Works ==
Stage plays include:

- Moonshine (1955)
- The Ark (1959)
- A Slight Accident (one-act 1961)
- Double Double (1962)
- Next Time I'll Sing To You (1962)
- Who was Hilary Maconochie? (one-act 1963)
- Neighbours (one-act 1964)
- A Scent of Flowers (1966)
- The Travails of Sancho Panza (1969)
- Games (one-act 1970)
- After Liverpool (one-act 1970)
- Hans Kolhaus (1972)
- A Journey to London (co-author, 1975)
- The Island (1976)
- Bodies (1977)
- Over the Wall (one-act 1977)
- Random Moments in a May Garden (1980)
- Retreat (1995)

== Sources ==
- Who's Who in the Theatre 14th Jubilee Edition, ed Freda Gaye, Pitman (1967)
- Who's Who in the Theatre 17th edition, ed Ian Herbert, Gale (Vols 1 and 2, 1981) ISBN 0-8103-0234-9
- Theatre Record and its annual Indexes
- Halliwell's Television Companion by Leslie Halliwell and Philip Purser, Grafton Books (1986) ISBN 0-246-12838-0
