= Charles Jarrott =

British film and TV director (1927–2011)

Charles Borlase Jarrott
- Born: 16 June 1927; London, England
- Died: 4 March 2011 (aged 83); Woodland Hills, California, United States
- Occupation: Director
- Years active: 1954–2002
- Spouse: Katherine Blake (1959–1982)
- Parent: Charles Jarrott
- Awards: Golden Globe Award for Best Director

Charles Borlase Jarrott (16 June 1927 – 4 March 2011) was a British film and television director, best known for costume dramas he directed for producer Hal B. Wallis, among them Anne of the Thousand Days.

== Early life ==
Born in London, Jarrott was the son of Charles Jarrott, an English racing car driver and businessman, and Ursula Jean Borlase.

He served in the Royal Navy during the Second World War.

== Career ==
After the war, Jarrott joined the Nottingham Repertory Theatre as an actor, and was soon working also as a stage manager and director. In 1953, he migrated to Canada and began to directed television plays for the Canadian Broadcasting Corporation, with Sydney Newman (who favoured original work) as his producer. In 1958, Newman took a post in England with ABC Television, and in 1960 Jarrott joined him there, to work in television drama, mostly on Armchair Theatre and The Wednesday Play with Ken Loach and Dennis Potter, both shows managed by Sydney Newman. In 1963, Newman moved to the BBC, and Jarrott again followed him, soon directing The Young Elizabeth (1964), with his wife Katherine Blake as Mary Tudor. Other work for the BBC included two plays by Harold Pinter, Tea Party (1965) and The Basement (1967).

In 1969, Jarrott left for Hollywood, when Hal B. Wallis invited him to direct Anne of the Thousand Days (1969), with Richard Burton as Henry VIII and Geneviève Bujold as Anne Boleyn. He stayed there, gaining a far greater income, but was mostly given less adventurous projects.

Anne of the Thousand Days was slated by the critic Pauline Kael, who claimed in a movie review that as a director Jarrott had no style or personality and that he was just "a traffic manager". The film went on to receive ten Academy Award nominations and earned Jarrott a Golden Globe for Best Director in 1970. Jarrott's next film, Mary, Queen of Scots (1971), with Vanessa Redgrave as Mary Stuart and Glenda Jackson as Queen Elizabeth I, was nominated for five Academy Awards and five Golden Globes.

His next film, Lost Horizon (1973) was a musical based on James Hilton's book about Shangri-La. The movie was a legendary flop, ending the career of producer Ross Hunter and damaging that of Jarrott. Gregory Peck then hired Jarrott to direct his film The Dove (1974), which was a modest success.

== Personal life ==
From 1949 to 1957, Jarrott was married to Rosemary Palin; in June 1959, he married secondly the South African born actress Katherine Blake, soon after her divorce from David Greene. They were divorced in 1982, and from 1992 to 2003 he was married to Suzanne Bledsoe. He died at Woodland Hills, Los Angeles, on 4 March 2011, aged 83, from prostate cancer.

== Selected filmography ==
- Time to Remember (1962)
- Anne of the Thousand Days (1969)
- Mary, Queen of Scots (1971)
- Lost Horizon (1973)
- The Dove (1974)
- Escape from the Dark (1976) (aka The Littlest Horse Thieves)
- The Other Side of Midnight (1977)
- The Last Flight of Noah's Ark (1980)
- Condorman (1981)
- The Amateur (1981)
- The Boy in Blue (1986)
- Poor Little Rich Girl: The Barbara Hutton Story (1987)
- Lucy & Desi: Before the Laughter (1991)
- Yes, Virginia, There Is a Santa Claus (1991)
- Lady Boss (1992)
- Morning Glory (1993)
- At the Midnight Hour (1995)
- The Secret Life of Algernon (1997)
- Turn of Faith (2002)
