= Pick of the Week (TV series) =

Canadian anthology television series

- Genre: Anthology
- Country of origin: Canada
- Original language: English
- No. of seasons: 2

Production
- Producer: Lyal Brown
- Running time: 30 minutes

Original release
- Network: CBC Television
- Release: 16 October 1967 – 29 September 1969

Pick of the Week is a Canadian anthology television series that aired on CBC Television from 1967 to 1969.

== Premise ==
Selected episodes of CBC's prime time series were rebroadcast in this weekday morning time slot such as Man Alive, Newsmagazine, The Public Eye, Singalong Jubilee and This Land. Sometimes a National Film Board of Canada production would be broadcast. The series sometimes gave national exposure to a local program such as CBC Winnipeg's Death Of A Nobody which presented First Nations concerns.

== Scheduling ==
This half-hour series was broadcast weekdays at 11:25 a.m. from 16 October 1967 to 29 September 1969.
