= Tea Party (play) =

Play written by Harold Pinter

- First publication (Methuen & Co. Ltd.)
- Based on: Tea Party by Harlod Pinter
- Written by: Harold Pinter
- Directed by: Charles Jarrott
- Country of origin: United Kingdom
- Original language: English

Original release
- Network: BBC Television
- Release: 25 March 1965

Tea Party is a play written by Harold Pinter, which Pinter adapted from his own 1963 short story of the same title. As a screenplay, it was commissioned by the European Broadcasting Union, directed by Charles Jarrott. It was the second film to be transmitted on BBC Television in the programme The Largest Theatre in the World on 25 March 1965 (Complete Works: Three 100), after Heart to Heart. It was first produced on stage in October 1968 as part of a double bill with Pinter's play The Basement.

== Synopsis ==
Tea Party "revolves around a family engaged in a business of sanitary engineering." According to an account published in the New Yorker, the play concerns "a middle-aged self-made business man named Sisson" (whom Pinter later renamed Disson), who engages a young secretary, marries a beautiful young second wife, and takes his new brother-in-law into his business–all in the same day";

Mysteries abound. What is going on between the wife and her brother? Are they indeed brother and sister? Sisson has his doubts about that … . Why does Sisson feel that there must be something wrong with his eyes, although he knows that he can see clearly and his eye doctor has assured him that his vision is perfect? He forces his secretary to tie a chiffon scarf over his eyes, and then he is able to make a pass at her, in response to one of her many come-ons. Ordinary events assume a sinister tinge. Sisson's two sons, giving him the deadpan treatment that little boys have been inflicting on their elders from time immemorial, seem as eerie as characters out of a ghost story. Always the questions remain. Is there a conspiracy against Sisson.

== Setting ==
"A modern office in London".

== Original cast of BBC TV production ==
As listed in the published texts, the original cast of the BBC TV production transmitted on 25 March 1965 was:

Disson	Leo McKern
Wendy	Vivien Merchant
Diana	Jennifer Wright
Willy	Charles Gray s
Disley	John Le Mesurier
Lois	Margaret Denyer
Father	Frederick Piper
Mother	Hilda Barry
Tom	Peter Bartlett
John	Robert Bartlett

The set was designed by Eileen Diss.

== Stage production ==
Tea Party was produced as part of a double bill with The Basement at the Eastside Playhouse in New York, directed by James Hammerstein, in October 1968, with the following cast:

Disson	David Ford
Wendy	Valerie French
Diana	June Emery
Willy	John Tillinger
Disley	Paul Sparer
Lois	Rose Roffman
Father	Bert Bertram
Mother	Hazel Jones
Tom	Michael Kearney
John	Darel Glaser
Waiters	David Dario, Alfred Hayes, Jr

Scenery was by Ed Wittstein, lighting by Neil Peter Jampolis, and costumes by Deidre Cartier.

Tea Party opened at the Duchess Theatre on 17 September 1970, also directed by James Hammerstein and produced by Eddie Kulukundis for Knightsbridge Theatrical Productions Ltd, with the following cast" (Complete Works: Three 101):

Disson	Donald Pleasence
Wendy	Vivien Merchant
Diana	Gabrielle Drake
Willy	Barry Foster
Disley	Derek Aylward
Lois	Jill Johnson
Father	Arthur Hewlett
Mother	Hilda Barry
Tom	Robin Angell
John	Kevin Chippendale

== Works cited ==
- "Harold Pinter (1930–2008) ". Doollee.com: The Playwrights Database, (last updated) 23 Feb. 2009. Web. 23 Feb. 2009.
- Pinter, Harold. Complete Works: Three. New York: Grove Press, 1978. ISBN 0-394-17051-2. [Contents: The Homecoming, Tea Party, The Basement, Landscape, Silence, Revue Sketches: "Night", "That's Your Trouble", "That's All", "Applicant", "Interview", "Dialogue for Three", "With the Memoir, 'Mac', and the short story, 'Tea Party' ".]
- –––. The Lover, Tea Party, The Basement: Two Plays and a Film Script. New York: Grove Press, 1967. ISBN 0-394-17263-9.
- –––. Plays Three. Expanded edn., Contemporary Classics series. London: Faber and Faber, 1997. ISBN 0-571-19383-8. [Contents: The Homecoming, Tea Party, The Basement, Landscape, Silence, "Night", "That's Your Trouble", "That's All", "Applicant", "Interview", "Dialogue for Three", "Tea Party" (short story), Old Times, No Man's Land.]
- –––. Tea Party and The Basement: Two Plays by Harold Pinter. Acting edn., first publ. 1969. New York: Dramatists Play Service, Inc., 1998. ISBN 0-8222-1115-7.
- –––. Various Voices: Prose, Poetry, Politics: 1948–2005. London: Faber and Faber, 2005. ISBN 0-571-23009-1.
