= Michael Wager =

American actor

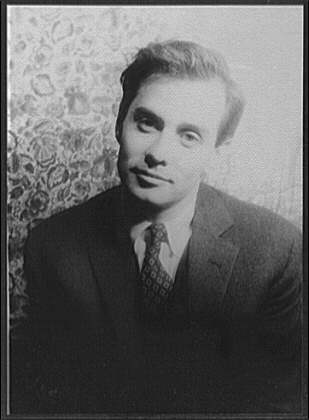
Michael Wager (1955) Photo by Carl Van Vechten

Michael Wager (born Emanuel Weisgal, April 29, 1925 – c. January 2012) was an American film and television actor.

Wager was born in New York, New York, and nicknamed "Mendy". He was the son of Meyer Weisgal, a journalist, publisher, playwright, fundraiser, and Zionist activist, and Shirley (Hirshfeld).

He appeared in the war films, Hill 24 Doesn't Answer and Exodus, and he appeared in a recurring role, as Jonas Roving, on the soap opera Ryan's Hope. One of his roles was Thomas the Apostle in King of Kings. He also appeared in the soap opera Search for Tomorrow and made TV commercials.

== Personal life ==
Wager married Susan Blanchard on October 9, 1962. He was bisexual.

Wager was a good friend of composer Leonard Bernstein and his wife Felicia. He lived above them in The Dakota in New York City.

== In popular culture ==
He was hugely into opera and the opera queen Mendy in Terrence McNally's play The Lisbon Traviata was based on him.

He was portrayed by Zachary Booth in Bradley Cooper's 2023 film Maestro.

== Filmography ==
Year	Title	Role	Notes
1955	Hill 24 Doesn't Answer	Allan Goodman	
1960	Exodus	David Ben Ami	
1961	King of Kings	Thomas	
1976	The Adams Chronicles	Albert Gallatin	Miniseries
1980	Jane Austen in Manhattan	George Midash	
1981	Ryan's Hope	Jonas Roving	Recurring role
