= Diplomatic Passport (TV program) =

- Also known as: Foreign Embassies
- Genre: Interview
- Presented by: Margaret Morris; Lloyd Robertson
- Narrated by: David Scrivens
- Country of origin: Canada
- Original language: English
- No. of seasons: 1

Production
- Producer: Ed Reid
- Production location: Ottawa
- Running time: 30 minutes

Original release
- Network: CBC Television
- Release: 16 October 1961 – 30 April 1962

Diplomatic Passport (also known as Foreign Embassies) is a Canadian interview television program that aired on CBC Television from 1961 to 1962.

== Premise ==
Episodes of this CBC Ottawa production featured interviews with ambassadors in Canada, often with their spouses, with scenes from their embassy properties.

== Scheduling ==
This half-hour program was broadcast Mondays at 4:00 p.m. (Eastern) from 16 October 1961 to 30 April 1962.
