= Colette Boky =

French-Canadian operatic soprano

Colette Boky (born Marie-Rose Élisabeth Giroux; June 4, 1935), CQ OC is a French-Canadian operatic soprano, particularly associated with lyric roles in the French, Italian, and German repertories.

== Life and career ==
Born Marie-Rose Élisabeth Giroux, in Montreal, Quebec, she studied voice at the École de musique Vincent-d'Indy from 1953–55, and then privately with Laurette Bailly. After winning a voice competition in 1958, she entered the Conservatoire de musique du Québec à Montréal, where she was a pupil of Roy Royal and Otto-Werner Mueller. In 1961, she made her stage debut with the "Théâtre lyrique de Nouvelle-France", as Rosina in Il barbiere di Siviglia. With the same company she sang Lakmé, the following year.

After winning the 1962 Prix d'Europe, she went to Paris to continue her studies with Janine Micheau and Raoul Jobin. She then won a second prize at the Geneva International Competition for musical performers, which led to her European debut in 1964, in Haydn's Lo speziale in Versailles. She was invited at the Bremen Opera for the 1964-65 season, where she sang Despina in Mozart's Cosi fan tutte, and in Stravinski's Le Rossignol. In 1965, she made her debut at the Salzburg Festival as Sandrina in Mozart's La finta giardiniera, followed by the lead soprano role in Rossini's La scala di seta at the Munich Festival.

In 1966, Boky began an association with the Vienna Volksoper, where she sang several roles. She also appeared with the Vienna Philharmonic Orchestra in Orff's Carmina Burana, and Haydn's Die Schöpfung, under Karl Richter.

Boky's career became truly international in 1967, with her Metropolitan Opera debut as The Queen of The Night in Mozart's The Magic Flute. She was to remain at the Met until 1979, singing some 25 leading roles there, such as Juliette, Marguerite, Pamina, Adina, Lucia, Gilda, Violetta, the four heroines of Offenbach's Les contes d'Hoffmann, Sophie in Der Rosenkavalier by Richard Strauss, among others. She also appeared in several US opera houses in Hartford, Miami, New Orleans, Philadelphia, San Francisco.

Boky began teaching at L'Université du Québec in 1981, and was artistic director of the opera studio there. She was awarded with the Calixa-Lavallée Award in 1971, and the Prix Denise Pelletier in 1986. She made several recordings during her career including three solo recital discs. The first on the RCA Victor Canada label (LSC-2693) from the mid-1960s is "Colette Boky Chante/Sings Strauss" and includes operetta and light Viennese classics and waltzes, Guy Luypaerts conducting; the second recorded in 1977 is on Radio Canada International (RCI-463) and includes melodies by Claude Debussy and Gabriel Faure with Janine Lachance at the piano; the third is a CD collection of "Sacred Arias" by Bach, Vivaldi, Handel, Mozart, Gounod, and Schubert on the Fonovox label, issued in 1996.

== Sources ==
- Gingras, Claude. "Colette Boky veut refaire son image", Montreal La Presse, February 24, 1975
- Fitzgerald, John. "Boky builds bridge of songs", Montreal Gazette, September 17, 1977
- Dawson, Eric. "Realization of a 10-year dream fulfilled with the Merry Widow", Calgary Herald, January 13, 1979
