= Yesterday the Children were Dancing =

Play by Gratien Gélinas

- Original language: French
- Written by: Gratien Gélinas

Premiere
- Date: 1966

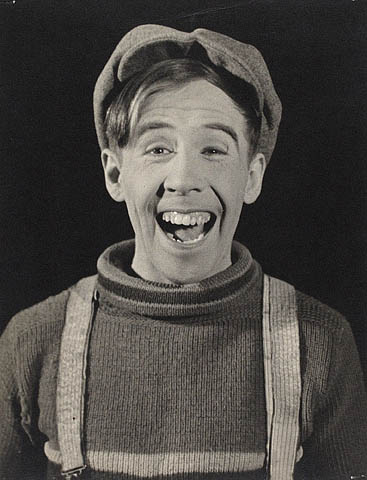
Gratien Gélinas as Fridolin, Montreal, Quebec, Canada, ca. 1938

Yesterday the Children were Dancing, or Hier, les enfants dansaient, is a Canadian, specifically Québécois play by Gratien Gélinas.

== Synopsis ==
The story is about a Member of Parliament, Pierre Gravel, who is offered the post of Minister of Justice. On the same day he gets this promotion he learns that one of his own son, André, is a Quebec separatist terrorist plotting to destroy a statue to James Wolfe in the city. In the resulting argument, father and son debate their loyalties and motivations in a discussion war over the affections of Louise Gravel, Pierre's wife.

== Adaptations ==
Mavor Moore translated Gélinas' play into English, and it was adapted for television. Gélinas starred in the production, along with family members Yves Gélinas and Alain Gélinas. The cast included Huguette Dlingy, Suzanne Levesque, Jacques Auger, Raoul Roborge, and Colette Courtois. The episode aired on the CBC Television anthology series Festival on 6 November 1968.
