= Maggie Morris =

Canadian broadcaster

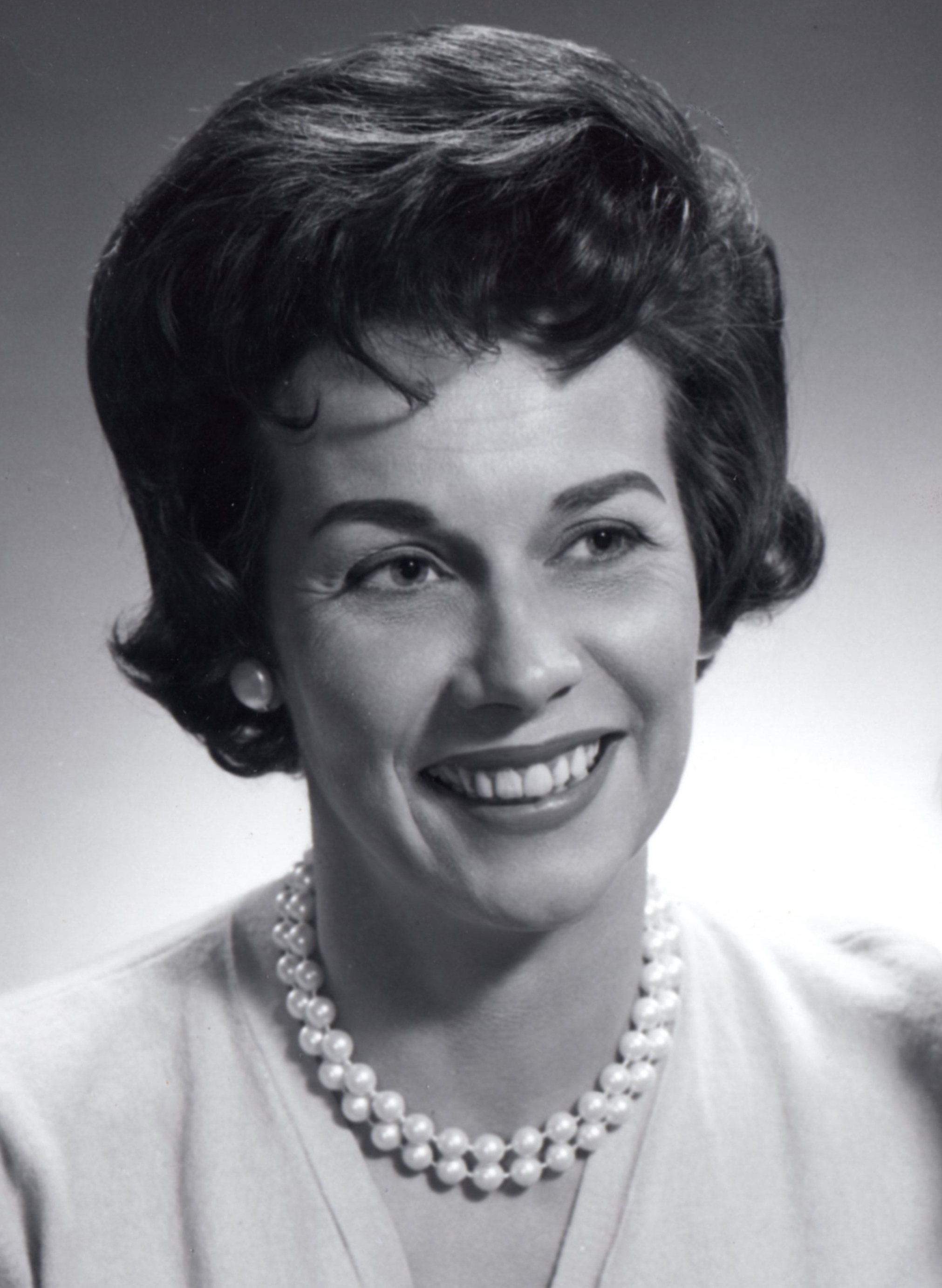
- Morris c.1962
- Born: Margaret Glenesk Beal; December 10, 1925; London, England
- Died: September 4, 2014 (aged 88); Toronto, Ontario, Canada
- Occupation: Television personality

Maggie Morris Smolensky (born Margaret Glenesk Beal; December 10, 1925 – September 4, 2014) was a Canadian radio and television personality of the 1960s best known as a panelist on the CBC Television show Flashback and as one of the first women on the CBC English language announce staff.

== Career ==
Maggie Morris began her professional career in radio drama in Winnipeg in 1954, moving to Ottawa in 1955 where her TV career included co-hosting the local programs Contact and Diplomatic Passport. She was the founding co-president of the Ottawa branch of ACTRA in 1960.

In 1962 in Toronto, she won a spot on Flashback, a new national CBC TV quiz show where she was the only cast member to remain for all six seasons (1962–1968). During the same period, she hosted her own CBC Radio music shows Swing Home With Maggie and Midnight With Maggie, and made guest appearances in such Canadian TV series as Wojeck and Quentin Durgens, M.P., and the TV movie The Write-Off.

Morris was accepted as a summer relief announcer on the CBC announce staff in Ottawa in 1961 and Toronto in 1963, the only woman to be so employed on the English language network. She joined the staff on contract in 1969, still the only woman. Her contract was renewed twice before she was fired in April 1970, making headlines across the country. The CBC hired its first permanent female staff announcer (Jan Tennant) later that year.

Maggie Morris's subsequent careers included working in public relations for Bell Canada and the Royal Winnipeg Ballet. Volunteer activities included reading for the CNIB in the Recording Library for the Blind for 25 years, and writing letters for Amnesty International.

== Personal life ==
Margaret Beal, the only child of James Cooper Beal and Jane McCallum Glenesk, was born in London, England, and raised in Scarborough, Yorkshire. Her memoir of growing up in Scarborough in the 1930s is archived online at the Scarborough Archeological and Heritage Society. In 1940 shortly after the outbreak of World War II, she was evacuated through the Children's Overseas Reception Board. She arrived at Pier 21, which has since been turned into the Canadian Museum of Immigration, where a memoir of her life as well as the diary she wrote during the evacuation are available online in its Collection. She spent most of the war in Winnipeg, Manitoba, Canada, where she attended Kelvin High School. In 1944, she returned to England and trained as a registered nurse at the Scarborough General Hospital obtaining her certificate of midwifery at North Middlesex Hospital. In 1950 she settled in Canada having gone back to Winnipeg for a wedding and eventually marrying the best man. She has two children from that marriage which ended in divorce. In 1971 she married Stanley Smolensky, a NASA engineer who was the Deputy Director of Launch Vehicles for the Apollo Program. He died of a heart attack later the same year.

Maggie Morris Smolensky died at home in Toronto in 2014 at age 88.
