= Susan Blanchard (socialite) =

American socialite (born 1928)

- Born: Susan Jacobson; March 8, 1928 (age 98)
- Occupations: Former lyricist and theatrical producer, socialite
- Spouses: Henry Fonda (m. 1950; div. 1956): Michael Wager (m. 1962; div. 1970); Charles Ades (m. 1971; div. ??); Richard Widmark (m. 1999; died 2008)
- Parent(s): Dorothy Blanchard; Henry Jacobson
- Relatives: Oscar Hammerstein II (step-father); James Hammerstein (maternal half-brother)

Susan Blanchard (née Jacobson; born March 8, 1928) is an American socialite and former lyricist and theatrical producer. She is the stepdaughter of Oscar Hammerstein II, the third wife of actor Henry Fonda, with whom she adopted a daughter, Amy Fishman (born 1953), and the widow of actor Richard Widmark.

== Background ==
The younger child of Dorothy Kiaora Blanchard, a native of Australia, and Henry Jacobson, a New York businessman, Susan Jacobson took her mother's surname after her parents' divorce and was known as Susan Blanchard thereafter. She studied at The Shipley School in Bryn Mawr, Pennsylvania.

== Personal life ==
Blanchard has been married four times, the first three marriages ending in divorce. Her first marriage was to actor Henry Fonda on December 27, 1950, and lasted until their divorce in May 1956. Peter Fonda told the Daily Express in 2014, "We were living in Rome and she came down to breakfast and told us. I was devastated and cried and she said, 'I'm young, I want to dance and tell jokes. I need to cut loose.' And I knew exactly what she meant." Her second marriage was to another actor, Michael Wager, in 1962, with whom she had a son. Her fourth marriage was in 1999 to actor and producer Richard Widmark, to whom she remained married until his death on March 24, 2008.
