= Oscar Hammerstein II =

American librettist (1895–1960)

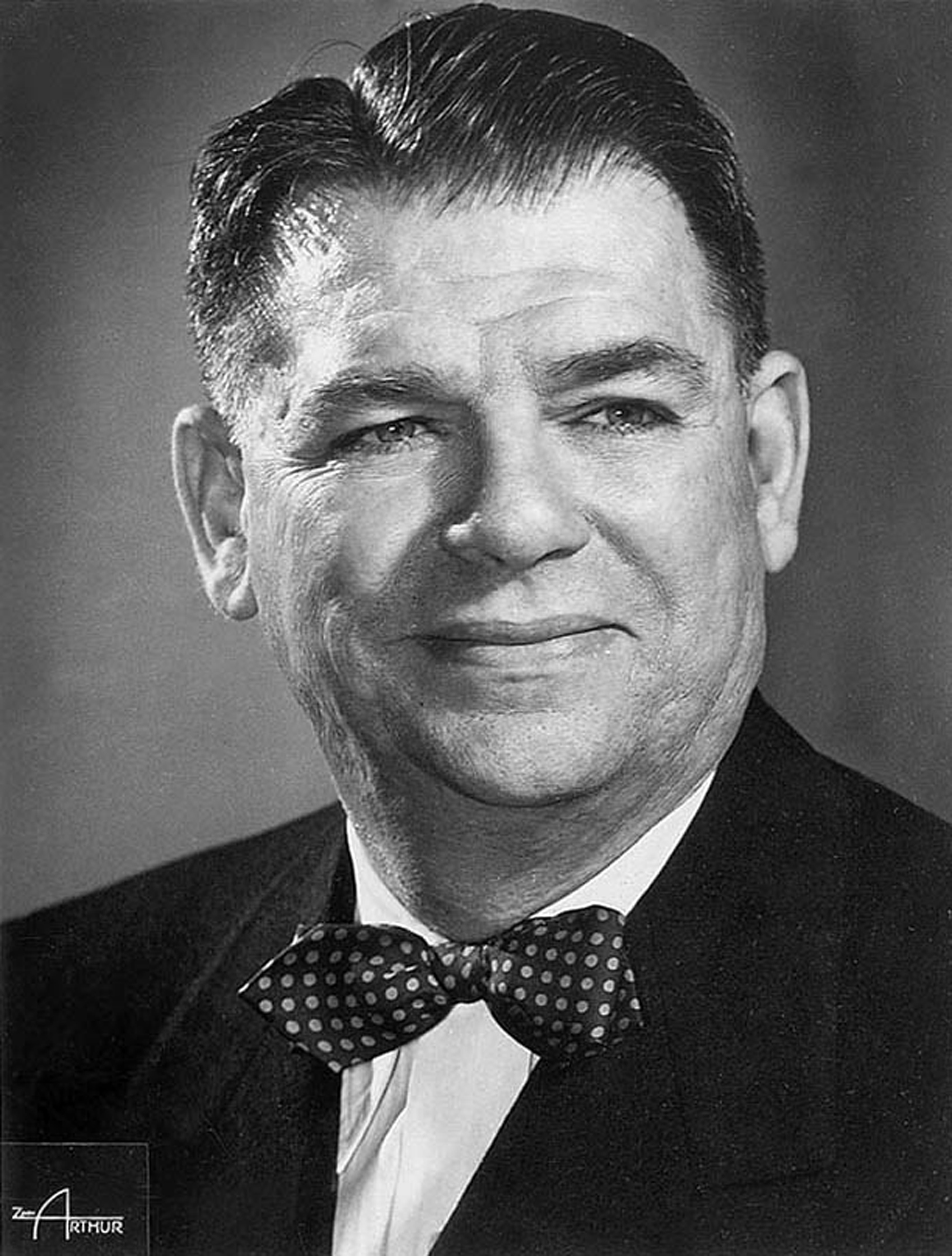
- Hammerstein c. 1940
- Born: Oscar Greeley Clendenning Hammerstein II; July 12, 1895; Harlem, New York, U.S.
- Died: August 23, 1960 (aged 65); Doylestown, Pennsylvania, U.S.
- Education: Columbia University (BA)
- Occupations: Librettist; theatrical producer; theater director
- Years active: 1914–1960
- Spouses: Myra Finn (m. 1917; div. 1929); Dorothy Blanchard Jacobson (m. 1929)
- Children: 3, including James
- Father: Willie Hammerstein
- Relatives: Oscar Hammerstein I (grandfather); Arthur Hammerstein (uncle); Stella Hammerstein (aunt); Elaine Hammerstein (cousin)
- Musical career
- Genres: Musical theater; popular

Oscar Greeley Clendenning Hammerstein II (/ˈhæmərstaɪn/; July 12, 1895 – August 23, 1960) was an American lyricist, librettist, theatrical producer, and director in musical theater for nearly 40 years. He won eight Tony Awards and two Academy Awards for Best Original Song. Many of his songs are standard repertoire for vocalists and jazz musicians. He co-wrote 850 songs.

He is best known for his collaborations with composer Richard Rodgers, as the duo Rodgers and Hammerstein, whose musicals include Oklahoma!, Carousel, South Pacific, The King and I, Flower Drum Song, and The Sound of Music. Described by his protégé Stephen Sondheim as an "experimental playwright", Hammerstein helped bring the American musical to new maturity by popularizing musicals that focused on stories and character rather than the lighthearted entertainment that the musical had been known for beforehand.

He also collaborated with Jerome Kern (with whom he wrote the 1927 musical Show Boat), Vincent Youmans, Rudolf Friml, Richard A. Whiting, and Sigmund Romberg.

== Early life ==
Oscar Greeley Clendenning Hammerstein II was born on West 125th Street in Harlem, New York, the son of theatrical manager William Hammerstein and his wife Alice (née Nimmo). His grandfather was the German theater impresario Oscar Hammerstein I. His father was from a Jewish family, and his mother was the daughter of British parents. He attended the Church of the Divine Paternity, now the Fourth Universalist Society in the City of New York.

Although Hammerstein's father managed the Victoria Theatre and was a producer of vaudeville shows, he was opposed to his son's desire to participate in the arts.

Hammerstein attended Columbia University (1912–1916) and studied at Columbia Law School until 1917. As a student, he maintained high grades and engaged in numerous extracurricular activities, including playing first base on the baseball team, performing in the Varsity Show, and becoming an active member of Pi Lambda Phi fraternity.

After his father's death, in June 1914, when he was 19, he participated in his first play with the Varsity Show, entitled On Your Way. Throughout the rest of his college career, Hammerstein wrote and performed in several Varsity Shows. Following his graduation, he sat on the judging committee for the show and continued to contribute to several musicals, including Fly With Me, written by Richard Rodgers and Lorenz Hart.

== Early career ==
After quitting law school to pursue theater, Hammerstein began his first professional collaboration, with Herbert Stothart, Otto Harbach and Frank Mandel. He began as an apprentice and went on to form a 20-year collaboration with Harbach. Out of this collaboration came his first musical, Always You, for which he wrote the book and lyrics. It opened on Broadway in 1920. In 1921 Hammerstein joined The Lambs club.

Throughout the next forty years, Hammerstein teamed up with many other composers, including Jerome Kern, with whom Hammerstein enjoyed a highly successful collaboration. In 1927, Kern and Hammerstein wrote their biggest hit based on Edna Ferber's bestselling eponymous novel, Show Boat, which is often revived, as it is considered one of the masterpieces of American musical theater. In the words of one theater historian, "Here we come to a completely new genre—the musical play as distinguished from musical comedy. Now ... the play was the thing, and everything else was subservient to that play. Now ... came complete integration of song, humor and production numbers into a single and inextricable artistic entity." Many years later, Hammerstein's wife Dorothy bristled when she overheard someone remark that Jerome Kern had written "Ol' Man River". "Indeed not," she retorted. "Jerome Kern wrote 'dum, dum, dum-dum'. My husband wrote 'Ol' Man River'."

Other Kern–Hammerstein musicals include Sunny, Sweet Adeline, Music in the Air, Three Sisters, and Very Warm for May. Hammerstein also collaborated with Vincent Youmans (Wildflower), Rudolf Friml (Rose-Marie), and Sigmund Romberg (The Desert Song and The New Moon).

== Rodgers and Hammerstein ==
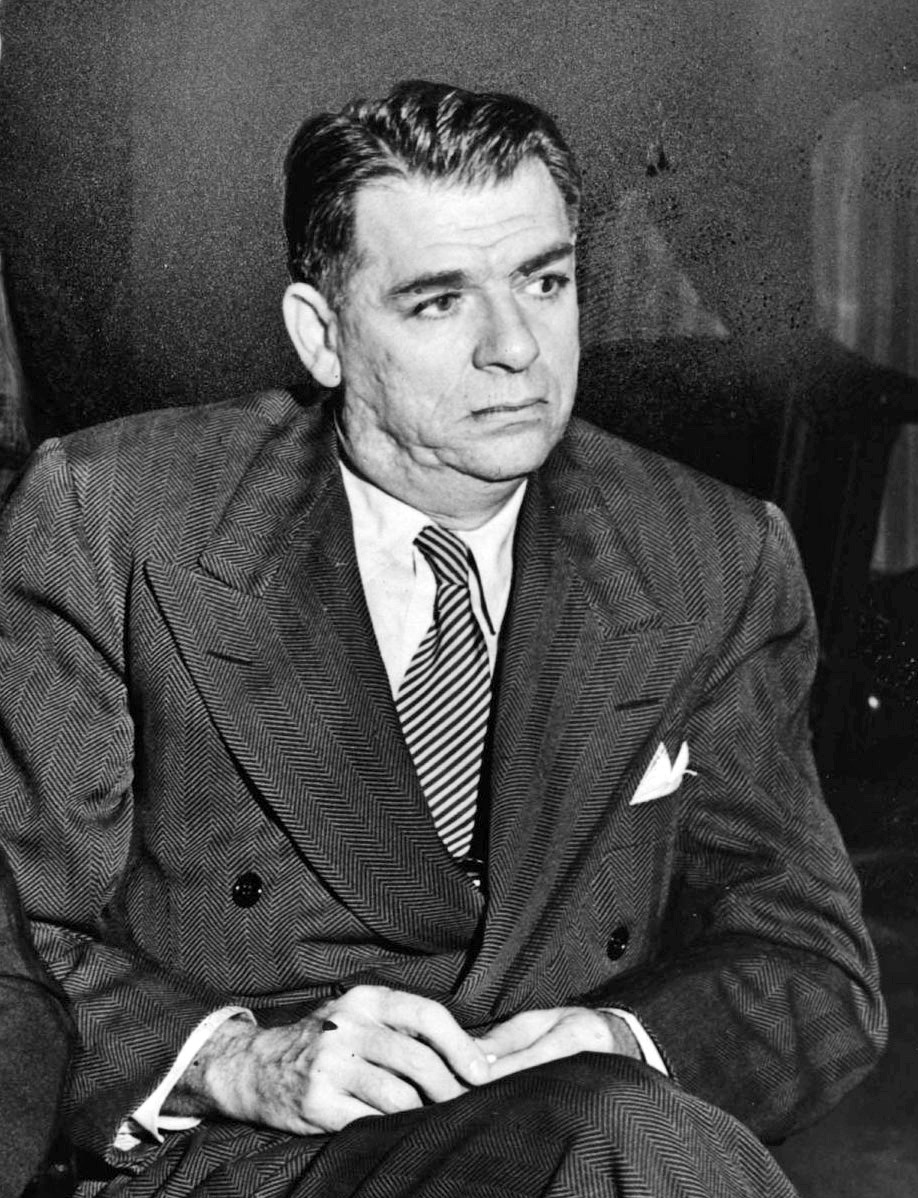
Hammerstein watching an audition at the St. James Theatre on Broadway, 1948

Hammerstein's most successful and sustained collaboration began when he teamed up with Rodgers to write a musical adaptation of the play Green Grow the Lilacs. Rodgers' first partner, Lorenz Hart, originally planned to collaborate with Rodgers on this piece, but his alcoholism had spiraled out of control, rendering him incapacitated. Hart was also not certain that the idea had much merit, and the two therefore separated. The adaptation became the first Rodgers and Hammerstein collaboration, titled Oklahoma!, which opened on Broadway in 1943. It furthered the revolution begun by Show Boat, by thoroughly integrating all the aspects of musical theater, with the songs and dances arising out of and further developing the plot and characters.

William A. Everett and Paul R. Laird wrote that this was a "show, that, like Show Boat, became a milestone, such that subsequent historians writing about important moments in twentieth-century theater began to identify eras according to their relationship to Oklahoma!" After Oklahoma!, Rodgers and Hammerstein were the most important contributors to the musical-play form—with such masterworks as Carousel, The King and I and South Pacific. As historian Mark Lubbock noted, "The examples they set in creating vital plays, often rich with social thought, provided the necessary encouragement for other gifted writers to create musical plays of their own".

The partnership went on to produce not only the aforementioned, but also other Broadway musicals such as Allegro, Me and Juliet, Pipe Dream, Flower Drum Song, and The Sound of Music, as well as the musical film State Fair (and its stage adaptation of the same name), and the television musical Cinderella, all featured in the revue A Grand Night for Singing. Hammerstein also wrote the book and lyrics for Carmen Jones, an adaptation of Georges Bizet's opera Carmen, with an all-black cast that became a 1943 Broadway musical and a 1954 film, starring Dorothy Dandridge.

== Advocacy ==
An active advocate for writers' rights within the theater industry, Hammerstein was a member of the Dramatists Guild of America. In 1956, he was elected as the eleventh president of the nonprofit organization. He continued his presidency at the Guild until 1960; he was succeeded by Alan Jay Lerner.

== Personal life ==
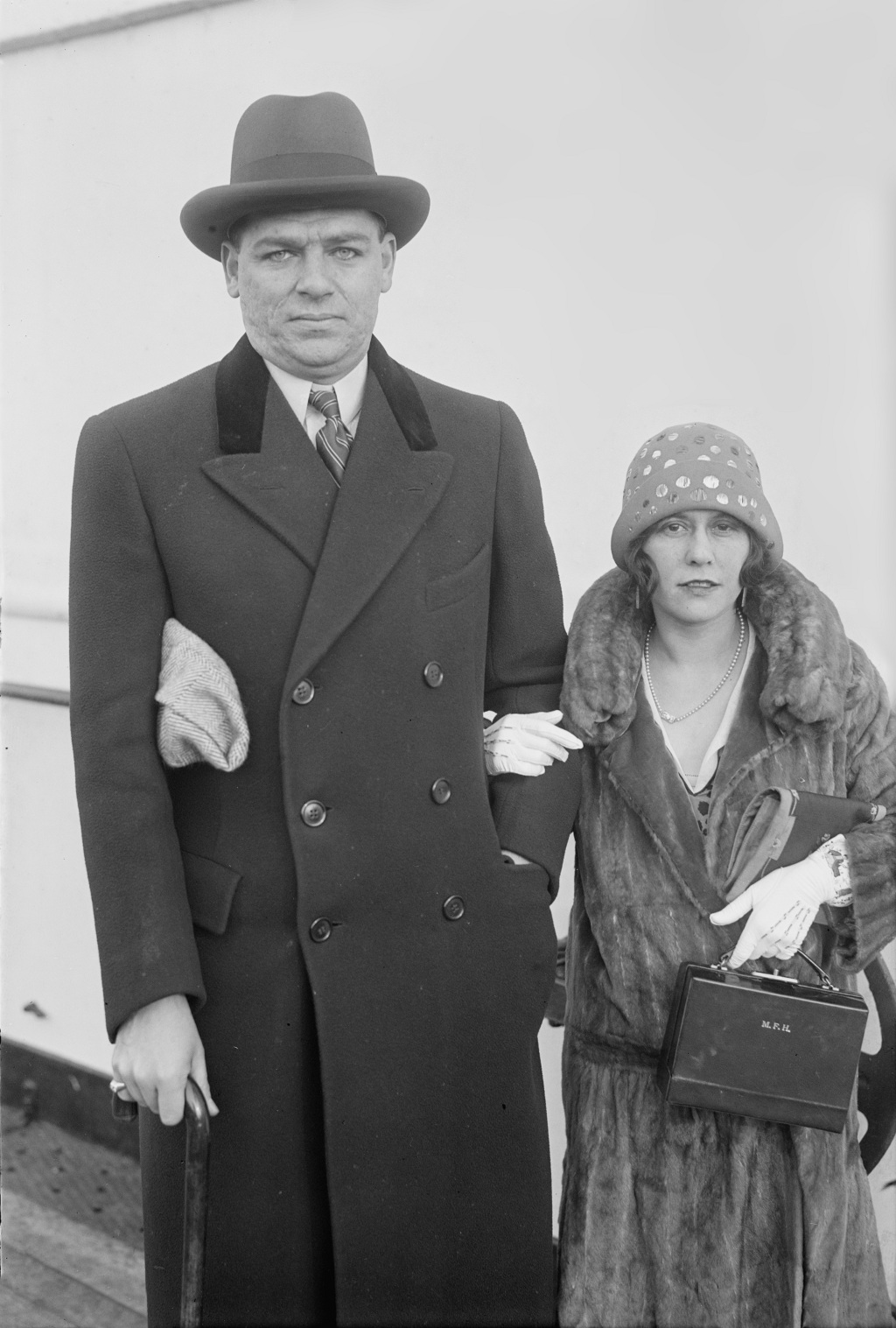
Hammerstein with his first wife, Myra Finn, photographed aboard a ship

Hammerstein married his first wife, Myra Finn, in 1917; the couple divorced in 1929. He married his second wife, the Australian-born Dorothy (Blanchard) Jacobson (1899–1987), in 1929. He had three children: William Hammerstein (1918–2001) and Alice Hammerstein Mathias (1922–2015) by his first wife, and James Hammerstein (1931–1999) by his second wife, with whom he also had a stepson, Henry Jacobson, and a stepdaughter, Susan Blanchard. His son William married the screenwriter Jane-Howard Hammerstein.

Hammerstein was lifelong Unitarian Universalist.

Hammerstein died of stomach cancer on August 23, 1960, at his home Highland Farm in Doylestown, Pennsylvania, aged 65, nine months after the opening of The Sound of Music on Broadway. The final song he wrote was "Edelweiss", which was added near the end of the second act during rehearsal. The lights of Times Square were turned off for one minute, and London's West End lights were dimmed in recognition of his contribution to the musical. He was cremated, and his ashes were buried at the Ferncliff Cemetery in Hartsdale, New York. A memorial plaque was unveiled at Southwark Cathedral, England, on May 24, 1961.

After Hammerstein's death, The Sound of Music was adapted as a 1965 film, which won the Academy Award for Best Picture.

== Political views and activism ==
Oscar Hammerstein II was a prominent New Deal liberal, civil rights advocate, and anti-racist activist whose humanistic political philosophy profoundly influenced both his theatrical career and his personal life. Though best known for his landmark contributions to the American musical theater, Hammerstein devoted significant energy to social justice, anti-fascism, and progressive political campaigns.

=== Political philosophy and party alignment ===
While Hammerstein maintained a close relationship with the Democratic Party, he did not view himself as a strict, lifelong partisan. In a 1958 televised interview with journalist Mike Wallace, Hammerstein explicitly rejected strict party labels, noting that he occasionally tried to vote Republican "just for the sake of switching—just for the sake of telling myself I'm not a party man".

However, he admitted that his core values inevitably guided his ballot, stating, "somehow or other I always wind up voting Democratic" because he believed the party's social and economic platforms were inherently healthier for the United States. Fundamentally, Hammerstein identified as a "small-'l' liberal" and a humanist, prioritizing civil liberties, internationalism, and social welfare over blind party loyalty. His alignment with the Democratic Party solidified during the 1930s and 1940s, driven by his strong support for President Franklin D. Roosevelt's New Deal and his fierce opposition to totalitarianism.

=== Activism and anti-fascism ===
During the buildup to World War II, Hammerstein became actively involved in the global fight against fascism. He co-founded the Hollywood Anti-Nazi League (HANL) to mobilize the entertainment industry and raise public awareness regarding the dangers of Nazi Germany.

His activism extended deep into the Civil Rights Movement. He was an ardent supporter of various racial equality organizations, including the Southern Negro Youth Congress (SNYC). His outspoken liberalism and association with progressive civil rights groups drew the attention of federal authorities during the Red Scare. Under the direction of J. Edgar Hoover, the Federal Bureau of Investigation (FBI) opened a file on Hammerstein, monitoring his loyalty and associations, though he was never a member of the Communist Party.

In mainstream electoral politics, Hammerstein put his professional talents to use for the Democratic Party. During the 1956 presidential election, he served as a political surrogate and speechwriter for Democratic nominee Adlai Stevenson II, crafting arguments centered on progressive governance and intellectual diplomacy.

=== Social and political themes in theater ===
Hammerstein intentionally used the stage as a vehicle for social commentary, embedding themes of tolerance, anti-imperialism, and equality into the librettos of his famous collaborations with Richard Rodgers:

- South Pacific (1949): The musical tackled institutionalized racial prejudice directly. Hammerstein penned the controversial song "You've Got to Be Carefully Taught", which argues that racism is not inherent but learned. When the show toured, the song faced intense political backlash, including attempts at censorship by lawmakers in Georgia who claimed it promoted communist ideology. Rodgers and Hammerstein steadfastly refused to remove the song, threatening to pull the production entirely rather than compromise its message.
- The King and I (1951): The production explored complex ideas surrounding cultural understanding, women's equality, and the pitfalls of western imperialism, advocating for mutual respect between disparate societies.
- The Sound of Music (1959): Hammerstein’s final musical served as a direct allegory against totalitarianism. The narrative dramatized the moral courage required to resist Nazi annexation (the Anschluss), positioning cultural and personal integrity as essential barriers against fascist subversion.

== Reputation ==
Hammerstein was one of the most important "book writers" in Broadway history—he made the story, not the songs or the stars, central to the musical and brought musical theater to full maturity as an art form. According to Stephen Sondheim, "What few people understand is that Oscar's big contribution to the theater was as a theoretician, as a Peter Brook, as an innovator. People don't understand how experimental Show Boat and Oklahoma! felt at the time they were done. Oscar is not about the 'lark that is learning to pray'—that's easy to make fun of. He's about Allegro", Hammerstein's most experimental musical.

His reputation for being sentimental is based largely on the movie versions of the musicals, especially The Sound of Music, in which a song sung by those in favor of reaching an accommodation with the Nazis, "No Way to Stop It", was cut. As recent revivals of Show Boat, Oklahoma!, Carousel, and The King and I in London and New York show, Hammerstein was one of the more tough-minded and socially conscious American musical theater artists. According to Richard Kislan, "The shows of Rodgers and Hammerstein were the product of sincerity. In the light of criticism directed against them and their universe of sweetness and light, it is important to understand that they believed sincerely in what they wrote." According to Marc Bauch, "The Rodgers and Hammerstein musicals are romantic musical plays. Love is important."

According to The Rodgers and Hammerstein Story by Stanley Green,

For three minutes, on the night of September first, the entire Times Square area in New York City was blacked out in honor of the man who had done so much to light up that particular part of the world. From 8:57 to 9:00 p.m., every neon sign and every light bulb was turned off and all traffic was halted between 42nd Street and 53rd Street, and between eighth Ave and the Avenue of the Americas. A crowd of 5,000 people, many with heads bowed, assembled at the base of the statue of Father Duffy on Times Square where two trumpeters blew taps. It was the most complete blackout on Broadway since World War II, and the greatest tribute of its kind ever paid to one man.

== Major works ==
Year	Title	Ref.
1943	Oklahoma!	
1945	Carousel	
1945	State Fair	
1947	Allegro	
1949	South Pacific	
1951	The King and I	
1953	Me and Juliet	
1955	Pipe Dream	
1957	Cinderella	
1958	Flower Drum Song	
1959	The Sound of Music	

=== Songs ===
According to The Complete Lyrics of Oscar Hammerstein II, edited by Amy Asch, Hammerstein contributed the lyrics to 850 songs, including "Ol' Man River", "Can't Help Lovin' That Man" and "Make Believe" from Show Boat; "Indian Love Call" from Rose-Marie; "People Will Say We're in Love" and "Oklahoma" (which has been the official state song of Oklahoma since 1953) from Oklahoma!; "If I Loved You" and "You'll Never Walk Alone" from Carousel, "Some Enchanted Evening", from South Pacific; "Getting to Know You" and "Shall We Dance" from The King and I; and the title song as well as "Climb Ev'ry Mountain" from The Sound of Music.

Several albums of Hammerstein's musicals were named to the "Songs of the Century" list as compiled by the Recording Industry Association of America (RIAA), the National Endowment for the Arts, and Scholastic Corporation:

- The Sound of Music — # 36
- Oklahoma! — # 66
- South Pacific — # 224
- The King and I — # 249
- Show Boat — # 312

== Awards and nominations ==
Year	Award	Category	Nominated work	Results	Ref.
1938	Academy Awards	Best Song	"A Mist over the Moon" (from The Lady Objects)	Nominated	
1941	Academy Awards	Best Song	"The Last Time I Saw Paris" (from Lady Be Good)	Won	
1945	Academy Awards	Best Song	"It Might as Well Be Spring" (from State Fair)	Won	
1946	Academy Awards	Best Song	"All Through the Day" (from Centennial Summer)	Nominated	
1951	Academy Awards	Best Song	"A Kiss to Build a Dream On" (from The Strip)	Nominated	
1960	Grammy Awards	Best Show Album (Original Cast)	"The Sound of Music"	Won	
1992	Grammy Awards	Trustees Award	—N/a	Won	
1944	Pulitzer Prize	Special Citations and Awards	Oklahoma!	Won	
1950	Pulitzer Prize	Drama	South Pacific	Won	
1950	Tony Awards	Best Musical	South Pacific	Won	
1950	Tony Awards	Best Libretto	South Pacific	Won	
1950	Tony Awards	Producers (Musical)	South Pacific	Won	
1952	Tony Awards	Best Musical	The King and I	Won	
1956	Tony Awards	Best Musical	Pipe Dream	Nominated	
1959	Tony Awards	Best Musical	Flower Drum Song	Nominated	
1960	Tony Awards	Best Musical	The Sound of Music	Won (Note: Tied with Fiorello!.)	
1996	Tony Awards	Best Original Score	State Fair	Nominated	

- Oscar Hammerstein is the only person in history named Oscar to have won an Oscar.
- In 1950, the team of Rodgers and Hammerstein received The Hundred Year Association of New York's Gold Medal Award "in recognition of outstanding contributions to the City of New York."
- In 1981, The Oscar Hammerstein II Center for Theater Studies at Columbia University was established with a $1 million gift from his family.

== Legacy ==
His advice and work influenced Stephen Sondheim, a friend of the Hammerstein family from childhood. Sondheim has attributed his success in theater, and especially as a lyricist, directly to Hammerstein's influence and guidance.

The Oscar Hammerstein Award for Lifetime Achievement in Musical Theater is presented annually. The York Theatre Company of New York City is the administrator of the award. Past awardees are composers such as Stephen Sondheim and performers such as Carol Channing.

Oscar Hammerstein was a member of the American Theater Hall of Fame.
