= James Hammerstein =

American theatre director and producer

- Born: James Blanchard Hammerstein; March 23, 1931
- Died: January 7, 1999 (aged 67); New York City, U.S.
- Occupations: Theatre director; producer
- Children: 5
- Parent(s): Oscar Hammerstein II; Dorothy Blanchard
- Relatives: Susan Blanchard (maternal half-sister); Willie Hammerstein (paternal grandfather); Oscar Hammerstein I (paternal great-grandfather); Arthur Hammerstein (paternal granduncle); Stella Hammerstein (paternal grandaunt)

James Blanchard Hammerstein (March 23, 1931 – January 7, 1999) was an American theatre director and producer.

== Life and career ==
Hammerstein was the son of interior designer Dorothy Hammerstein (née Blanchard) and lyricist Oscar Hammerstein II. He had four half-siblings, two through each of his parents' earlier marriages: William and Alice Hammerstein from his father's side, and Henry Jacobson and Susan Blanchard from his mother's side.

Hammerstein attended George School in Newtown, Pennsylvania, where he met fellow student Stephen Sondheim. He began his Broadway career as a stage manager, notably for shows such as South Pacific, Me and Juliet, and Flower Drum Song, all co-written by his father Oscar Hammerstein II and Richard Rodgers. The first play he produced was Blue Denim, by James Leo Herlihy and William Noble, and the first play he directed was the comedy Absence of a Cello in 1964. The New York Times wrote: "James Hammerstein has staged the piece with a great deal of verve." His other directing credits include The Indian Wants the Bronx, Wise Child and Butley.

Hammerstein directed the New York City Opera production of The Sound of Music in 1990. He co-directed the Rodgers and Hammerstein stage musical State Fair in 1996. Among the other Rodgers and Hammerstein musicals he directed were Oklahoma! (London and Australia), The King and I (Tel Aviv, US and UK tours), and Carousel.

For many years he directed staged readings of notable playwrights, such as Jeff Wanshel, Ron Cowen, and Werner Liepolt as "American Triptych," under the auspices of George White and Lloyd Richards' National Playwrights Conference at the Eugene O'Neill Theater Center in Waterford, Conn.

Hammerstein was nominated for the 1997 Drama Desk Award for Outstanding Musical Revue for I Love You, You're Perfect, Now Change (as producer) and the 1990 Drama Desk Award for Outstanding Director of a Musical for The Sound of Music.

Hammerstein had one child (Oscar Andrew) with his first wife Basia, two children (Will and Jennifer) with his second wife Millette Alexander, and one child (Simon) with his third wife Geraldine Sherman. He died in Manhattan after suffering a heart attack.
