= The Public Eye (TV program) =

- Genre: Public affairs
- Created by: Richard Nielsen
- Presented by: Philip Deane (1965-67); Warner Troyer (1967-68); Norman DePoe (1968-69); Larry Zolf (1968-69); Barry Callaghan (1968-69); Peter Jennings (1968-69); Jeanne Sauve' (1968-69)
- Country of origin: Canada
- Original language: English
- No. of seasons: 4

Production
- Producers: Warner Troyer; Robert Patchell; Sam Levene; Larry Zolf

Original release
- Network: CBC Television
- Release: 5 October 1965 – 18 June 1969

The Public Eye is a Canadian public affairs television program that aired on CBC Television from 1965 to 1969.

== Premise ==
This news program covered various subjects of global and domestic scope.

Some 1966 episodes were co-produced with CBC's Newsmagazine program and identified as This Week. Its 1966 production budget was approximately $18,000 per episode.

A June 1966 episode featured the conflict between Canadian leaders Lester B. Pearson and John Diefenbaker, noting how their adversarial relationship concealed more fundamental national concerns.

After a popular series of "town meeting" segments in the 1967–68 season, a studio audience was introduced as a regular feature of the following, final season. Prime Minister Pierre Trudeau appeared in a later episode.

== Scheduling ==
This half-hour program was broadcast as follows (times are in Eastern):

Day	Time	Run	
Tuesday	10:30 p.m.	5 October 1965	21 June 1966
Tuesday	10:30 p.m.	1 November 1966	2 May 1967
Sunday	10:00 p.m.	14 May 1967	25 June 1967
Tuesday	10:30 p.m.	12 September 1967	18 April 1968
Tuesday	10:30 p.m.	23 April 1968	18 June 1968
Wednesday	9:00 p.m.	2 October 1968	18 June 1969

== Bibliography ==
- Rutherford, Paul (1990). When Television Was Young: Primetime Canada 1952-1967. University of Toronto Press. ISBN 0-8020-5830-2.
