= Brian Browne =

Canadian jazz pianist and composer

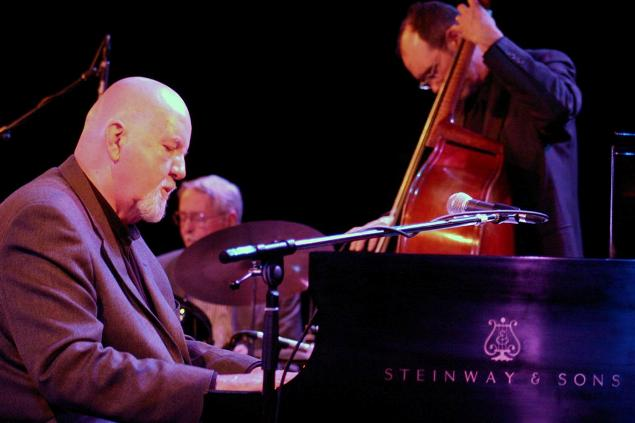

Background information
- Born: March 16, 1937; Montreal, Quebec, Canada
- Died: June 5, 2018 (aged 81) Kanata, Ontario, Canada
- Genres: Jazz
- Occupations: Musician, composer
- Instrument: Piano
- Years active: 1956–2018
- Labels: Capitol, RCA Victor, JazzImage, Triplet
- Website: Official website

Brian Browne (March 16, 1937 – June 5, 2018) was a Canadian jazz pianist and composer.

Born in Montreal, Quebec, Browne moved to Ottawa as a teenager and was playing professionally by the age of eighteen. Though largely self-taught, Browne attended the Berklee School of Music in Boston, Massachusetts and later studied with Oscar Peterson at Peterson's Advanced School of Contemporary Music in Toronto.

Browne rose to prominence in the Canadian jazz scene in the early 1960s, performing in popular jazz venues in Ottawa and Toronto, and appearing in national weekly CBC Radio programs Adventures in Rhythm, The Browne Beat, Nightcap, Jazz Canada and others.

His group, the Brian Browne Trio, performed as the house band on the CTV musical variety program The River Inn. In 1969 Browne appeared as one of four featured pianists, including Bill Evans, Erroll Garner and Marian McPartland, on the CBC television special The Jazz Piano.

Browne recorded with Canadian singer Anne Murray on her albums This Way is My Way and Honey, Wheat and Laughter and appeared on her subsequent CBC television special. He earned a BMI Canada 1970 Certificate of Honor for his original piece "Morning, Noon and Nighttime Too". The Brian Browne Trio has included other notable Canadian musicians Skip Beckwith, Donald Vickery, Paul Novotny, Barry Elmes, Michel Donato, and Archie Alleyne.

Browne has recorded 11 albums with Capitol Records, RCA Victor, CBC JazzImage, and Sea Jam Recordings (now Triplet Records). He died of lung and tracheal cancer on June 5, 2018.

== Discography ==
Year recorded	Title	Label	Personnel/Notes
	The Toronto Scene	RCA Victor	Trio, with Pearson "Skip" Beckwith (bass), Donald Vickery (drums)
	Listen, People!	RCA Victor	Trio, with Pearson "Skip" Beckwith (bass), Donald Vickery (drums)
1969?	The Letter		Trio, with Pearson "Skip" Beckwith (bass), Bruce Philp (percussion)
1970s	Live at the Park Plaza	Bread	Trio, with Terry Browne (bass), Doug Johnston (drums)
	Beatles	Canadian Broadcasting Corporation	Trio
1986	Odyssey		Solo piano; in concert
2001?	Tramps		Trio, with Paul Novotny (bass), Barry Elmes (drums); in concert
	Blue Browne	Sea Jam	Trio
	Quiet Night		Trio, with Paul Novotny (bass), Barry Elmes (drums)
	Christmas		Solo piano
	The Erindale Sessions		Trio, with Paul Novotny (bass), Daniel Barnes (drums)
	Brian Browne Trio at the National Arts Centre		Trio, with Paul Novotny (bass), Daniel Barnes (drums); in concert; DVD also released
