= Outline of film =

Visual art consisting of moving images

The following outline is provided as an overview of and topical guide to film:

A film, movie, or motion picture is a work of visual art that simulates experiences and otherwise communicates ideas, stories, perceptions, emotions, or atmosphere through the use of moving images that are generally, since the 1930s, synchronized with sound and sometimes feature other sensory stimuli.

== What type of thing is film? ==
Film can be described as all of the following:

- Art – aesthetic expression for presentation or performance, and the work produced from this activity.
  - One of the arts – as an art form, film is an outlet of human expression, that is usually influenced by culture and which in turn helps to change culture. Film is a physical manifestation of the internal human creative impulse.
    - One of the visual arts – visual arts is a class of art forms, including painting, sculpture, photography, printmaking and others, that focus on the creation of works which are primarily visual in nature.
    - One of the performing arts – art forms in which artists use their body, voice, or objects to convey artistic expression. Performing arts include a variety of disciplines but all take the form of a performance in front of an audience.
    - Fine art – in Western European academic traditions, fine art is art developed primarily for aesthetics, distinguishing it from applied art that also has to serve some practical function. The word "fine" here does not so much denote the quality of the artwork in question, but the purity of the discipline according to traditional Western European canons.
- Show business – a means of providing employment for actors, screenwriters, artisans and technicians, regardless of whether the finished film was produced as a for-profit enterprise or as a not-for-profit public service.

=== Other names for film ===
- Movie
- Motion picture
- Talking picture
- Picture
- Celluloid
- Flick (or flicker)
- Photoplay
- Picture show
- The cinema
- The silver screen (talkie era); the silver sheet (silent era)
- Videos

== Essence of film ==
- Filmmaking – process of making a film. Filmmaking involves a number of discrete stages including an initial story, idea, or commission, through scriptwriting, casting, shooting, editing, and screening the finished product before an audience that may result in a film release and exhibition. Filmmaking is both an art and an industry. That is why they call it "show business". It's a show and a business. Films were originally recorded onto nitrate film stock which was highly flammable. After the late 1950s, polyester film was used which was shown through a movie projector onto a large screen (in other words, an analog recording process). The adoption of CGI-based special effects led to the use of digital intermediates. Most contemporary films are now fully digital through the entire process of production, distribution, and exhibition from start to finish.

== Cinematic and television genres ==
=== By setting ===
- Biography - portrays a real-life character in his or her real-life story
- Crime - places its character within realm of criminal activity
- Fantasy - films set in imaginary worlds, often with a swords and sorcery theme
- Film noir - portrays its principal characters in a nihilistic and existentialist realm or manner
- Historical - taking place in the past
- Science fiction - placement of characters in an alternative reality, typically in the future or in outer space
- Sports - sporting events and locations pertaining to a given sport
- War - battlefields and locations pertaining to a time of war
- Western - colonial period to modern era of the western United States

=== By mood ===
- Action - generally involves a moral interplay between "good" and "bad" played out through violence or physical force
- Adventure - involving danger, risk, and/or chance, often with a high degree of fantasy
- Comedy - intended to provoke laughter
- Drama - mainly focuses on character development
- Erotic - sexuality or eroticism and sex acts, including love scenes
- Horror - intended to provoke fear in audience
- Mystery - the progression from the unknown to the known by discovering and solving a series of clues
- Pornographic - includes sexually explicit content subject matter in order to arouse, fascinate, or satisfy the viewer
- Romance - dwelling on the elements of romantic love
- Thriller - intended to provoke excitement and/or nervous tension into audience

=== By format ===
- Biographical - a biopic is a film that dramatizes the life of an actual person, with varying degrees of basis in fact
- Documentary - a factual following of an event or person to gain an understanding of a particular point or issue
- Experimental (avant-garde) - created to test audience reaction or to expand the boundaries of film production/story exposition then generally at play
- Musical - a film interspersed with singing by all or some of the characters
- Silent - a film with no synchronized recorded sound, especially with no spoken dialogue

=== By production type ===
- Live action - film using actors
- Animation - illusion of motion by consecutive display of static images which have been created by hand or on a computer
- Television - a film that is produced for and originally distributed by a television network

=== By length ===
- Short - may strive to contain many of the elements of a "full-length" feature, in a shorter time-frame
- Serial - similar to shorts, but forms a constant story arc
- Feature film - film that is "full-length"

=== By age ===
- Children's film - films for young children; as opposed to a family film, no special effort is made to make the film attractive for other audiences
- Family - intended to be attractive for people of all ages and suitable for viewing by a young audience; examples of these are Disney films
- Teen film - intended for and aimed towards teens although some teen films, such as the High School Musical series; may also be a family film; not all of these films are suitable for all teens, as some are rated R
- Adult film - intended to be viewed only by an adult audience, content may include violence, disturbing themes, obscene language, or explicit sexual behaviour. This includes various forms of exploitation films. Adult film may also be used as a synonym for pornographic film.

=== By audience reception ===
- Cult film – Films with a devoted fanbase
- Midnight movie – Late-night-programmed genre picture or offbeat film
- Sleeper hit – Successful media that was initially unsuccessful
- Underground film – Genre of film outside the mainstream

=== Other genres ===
- Action comedy – Film and TV genre
- Action film – Film genre
- Actuality film – Film genre using footage of real events
- Adventure film – Film genre
- Amateur film – Genre of low-budget film by non-professionals
- American eccentric cinema – Mode of American filmmaking
- Animated documentary – Genre of film that combines animation and documentary
- Anthology film – Feature film consisting of several different short films
- Apocalyptic and post-apocalyptic fiction – Genre of fiction
- Art film – Film genre
- Art horror – Film genre
- Arthouse animation – Combination of art film and animated film
- Arthouse science fiction film – Genre of film
- Australian Western – Sub-genre
- B movie – Low-budget commercial film genre
- Backstage musical – Genre of musical theatre
- Badaga cinema – Badaga-language film industry
- Beach party film – Film genre
- Behind-the-scenes – Documentary film that features the production of a film or television program
- Bildungsroman – Coming of age literary genre
- Biographical film – Film genre
- Black comedy – Comedic work based on taboo subject matter
- Black film – Film largely featuring or representing black people
- Blaxploitation – Film genre
- Body horror – Subgenre of horror fiction
- Bomba (genre) – 1960s Filipino film genre
- Bourekas film – Genre of Israeli comic melodrama
- Bromantic comedy – Comedy film genre
- Buddy cop – Film and television genre
- Buddy film – Film genre in which two people of the same sex are non-romantically paired
- Cannibal film – Film genre
- Cartoon – Type of two-dimensional visual art
- Cartoon pornography – Cartoon characters in sexual situations
- Chicano cinema – Filmmaking style
- List of Chicano films
- Chick flick – Slang term for romantic film genre catering to young women
- Children's film – Film genre
- Chopsocky – Term for martial arts films
- Christian film industry – Aspect of Christian media
- Christmas horror – Genre of fiction and film
- Cinema da Boca do Lixo – Film Genre
- Cinéma vérité – Style of documentary filmmaking
- Cinepoetry
- Colonial cinema – Cinema produced by the colonizing nation in and about their colonies
- Comédia à portuguesa
- Comedy drama – Genre of theatre, film, and television
- Comedy film – Genre of film that emphasizes humour
- Comedy horror – Genre that combines elements of horror and comedy
- Comedy of remarriage – Film genre
- Comedy thriller – Film genre
- Science fiction comedy – Comedic subgenre of science fiction
- List of coming-of-age stories
- Coming-of-age story – Genre of stories of growing into adulthood
- Commedia sexy all'italiana – Italian film genre
- Compilation film – Film edited from previously released footage
- Composite film – Film whose screenplay is composed of two or more distinct stories
- Concert film – Audiovisual recording of a concert performance
- Conspiracy fiction – Subgenre of thriller fiction
- Crime film – Film genre
- Cult film – Films with a devoted fanbase
- Dance film – Film in which dance is a central element in the narrative
- Detective fiction – Subgenre of crime and mystery fiction
- Direct cinema – Style of documentary filmmaking
- Disaster film – Film genre
- Docudrama – Genre featuring dramatized historical re-enactments
- Docufiction – Film genre
- Documentary film – Nonfictional motion picture
- Drama (film and television) – Genre
- Economics film
- Educational film – Film genre
- Epic film – Style of filmmaking with large scale, sweeping scope, and spectacle
- Erotic thriller – Film and literary sub-genre
- Erra cinema – Collection of political films in Telugu
- Ethnofiction – Subfield of ethnography
- Ethnographic film – Non-fiction film genre
- Euro War – Subgenre of war films
- European art cinema – Film genre in Europe
- Eurospy film – Genre of spy films
- Experimental film – Cinematic works that are experimental form or content
- Exploitation film – Informal film genre
- Fantasy comedy – Comedic subgenre of fantasy
- Fantasy film – Film genre
- Female buddy film – Film genre
- Film à clef – Cinematographic genre
- Film d'art – French movement of early narrative films
- Film gris – Film genre
- Film noir – Crime films with cynical atmosphere
- Filmfarsi – Film genre used in pre-revolutionary Iranian cinema
- Florida Western – Works set in the 19th century
- Folk horror – Subgenre of horror film and literature
- Gangster film – Film genre
- Gendai-geki – Japanese film, television, and theater genre
- Gentleman thief – Stock character; a sophisticated and well-mannered thief
- German underground horror – Film genre
- Giallo – Film genre
- Girls with guns – Sub-genre of action films and animation
- Gods and demons fiction – Subgenre of Chinese fantasy fiction
- Gokudō – Cheaply produced (often direct to video) Yakuza movies, with themes of sex and violence
- Gong'an fiction – Chinese crime fiction subgenre
- Goona-goona epic – Exploitation film genre
- Gothic film – Film genre
- Gothic romance film – Film genre
- Grindhouse – Low-budget movie theater that shows mainly exploitation films
- Gross out – Shock effect technique in media and art
- Guerrilla filmmaking – Micro-budget film genre
- Gun fu – Style of fictional fighting found in film, television, and videogames
- Hanukkah film – Film genre whose main subject matter is the Jewish holiday of Hanukkah
- Heimatfilm – Film genre
- Heist film – Subgenre of crime films
- Heritage film – Period films with high-quality visual production values
- Historical drama – Film subgenre
- Historical fiction – Genre of fiction that is set in the past
- Home movie – Film or video recording family activities
- Hood film – Film genre originating in the United States
- Horror film – Film genre
- Horror noir – Film genre
- Hybrid genre – Genre that blends themes and elements from two or more different genres
- Hyperlink cinema – Multilinear filmmaking style
- Independent film – Film done outside of the major film studio system
- Industrial video – Film created for an industrial company
- Interstitial art – Art of basic nature
- Jiangshi fiction – Literary and cinematic genre of horror
- Jidaigeki – Japanese media and theatre genre
- Jukebox musical – Musical compiled from existing songs
- Kaiju – Japanese media genre
- Khasi cinema – Khasi-language film industry
- Korean melodrama – Korean film genre
- Kung fu film – Film genre
- Legal drama – Subgenre of dramatic fiction
- Legal thriller – Fiction genre
- List of Western subgenres
- Live-action animated film – Film genre combining live-action and animated elements
- Luchador films – Lucha Libre based films
- Mafia comedy film – Film genre
- Mafia film – Version of gangster film
- Magic realism – Style of literary fiction and art
- Malayalam softcore pornography – Genre of softcore pornographic films produced in Kerala, India
- Martial arts film – Film genre
- Masala film – Indian film genre
- Maximalist film – Genre of cinema
- Medical drama – Television program or film presented around medical environments
- Melodrama – Dramatic work that exaggerates plot and characters to appeal to the emotions
- Message picture – Film intended to communicate sociopolitical ideas as well as entertain
- Metacinema – Self-reflexive mode of filmmaking
- Mexploitation – Film genre
- Micro movie – Type of short film
- Midnight movie – Late-night-programmed genre picture or offbeat film
- Minimalist film – Cinema related to the philosophy of minimalism
- Mo lei tau – Type of slapstick humour associated with Hong Kong popular culture
- Mockbuster – Film made to exploit another's publicity
- Mockumentary – Comedic film and television genre
- Modernist film – Film genre
- Mondo film – Film genre
- Monster movie – Film genre
- Mountain film – Film genre focusing on mountaineering
- Mumblecore – Film subgenre
- Musical film – Film genre
- Musical short – Short films featuring music
- Musicarello – Italian film sub genre; musical comedy typically featuring a young singing star
- Muslim social – Film genre in Bollywood
- Mystery film – Genre of film
- Mythopoeia – Narrative genre in modern literature and film
- Narco pelicula – Mexican action film sub-genre
- Narrative film – Tells a fictional or fictionalized story, event or narrative
- Nazi exploitation – Subgenre of film
- Neo-noir – Film genre; modern form of film noir
- New queer cinema – Movement in queer-themed independent filmmaking
- No-budget film – Film made with very little or no money
- Non-narrative film – Aesthetic of cinematic film
- Northern (genre) – Multimedia genre set primarily in Northern Canada and Alaska
- Opera film – Recording of an opera on film
- Operetta film – Film genre
- Ostern – Western-inspired film genre
- Outlaw biker film – Film genre
- Ozploitation – Genre of film produced in Australia
- Paracinema – Academic term for a variety of film genres out of the mainstream
- Parallel cinema – 1950s movement in Indian cinema
- Parody film – Film genre
- Pastoral science fiction – Science fiction subgenre
- Pink film – Japanese erotic cinema
- Poetry film – Film genre
- Political thriller – Genre of fiction
- Poliziotteschi – Genre of Italian crime films
- Pornochanchada – Genre of sex comedy films produced in Brazil
- Pornographic film – Films that present sexually explicit subject matter
- Postmodern horror – Subgenre of film
- Postmodernist film – Film genre
- The Prague film school – Eastern European film school, late 20th century
- Prison film – Film genre focused on prisons
- Propaganda film – Movie genre
- Prussian film – Film genre
- Pseudo-documentary – Documentary genre that features fictional events
- Psychedelic film – Film genre
- Psychological drama – Narrative subgenre of drama with psychological fiction
- Psychological horror – Narrative subgenre
- Psychological thriller – Genre combining thriller and psychological fiction
- Pulp noir – Fiction subgenre
- Quinqui (film genre) – Spanish film genre
- Race film – Film genre
- Rape and revenge – Film subgenre
- Real time (media) – Theatrical genre
- Reality film – Genre of documentary film
- Religious horror – Film genre combining horror with religious themes and imagery
- Remodernist film – Film genre
- Retrospective – Look back at events that took place before
- Road movie – Film genre in which the main characters embark on a road trip
- Romance film – Film genre
- Romantic comedy – Film genre
- Romantic drama – Film genre
- Romantic fantasy – Subgenre of fantasy fiction
- Romantic musical – Film genre
- Romantic thriller – Genre that involves romance and thriller
- Rumberas film – Film genre
- Samurai cinema – Film genre
- Satanic film – Subgenre of horror film which depicts the Devil and associated wicked themes
- Satire – Literary and art genre with a style of humor based on parody
- Sceneggiata – Form of musical drama typical of Naples
- Science fiction film – Film genre
- Screenlife – Film subgenre where events are shown on a screen of a device
- Screwball comedy – Genre of comedy film
- Semidocumentary – Form of storytelling
- Sex report film – Film genre
- Sexploitation film – Genre of independently produced, low-budget feature films
- Sharksploitation – Subgenre of exploitation film
- Shinpa – Japanese form of theater
- Shoshimin-eiga – Japanese film genre
- Silent film – Motion pictures without synchronized recorded sound
- Skate video – Film genre
- Slapstick – Style of comedy
- Slapstick film – Film genre
- Slasher film – Horror film subgenre
- Slow cinema – Genre of art cinema
- Snuff film – Film showing real murders
- Social film
- Social guidance film – Educational film genre
- Social problem film – Narrative movie about a social issue
- Social thriller – Genre combining thriller fiction with social commentary
- South Seas genre – Literary and film genre
- Soviet parallel cinema – Underground film movement in the Soviet Union
- Space Western – Subgenre of science fiction
- Spaghetti Western – Italian Western subgenre
- Splatter film – Horror genre
- Sponsored film – Film genre
- Sports film – Film genre
- Spy film – Film genre
- Stag film – Silent pornographic film genre
- Stoner film – Subgenre of comedy films
- Submarine films – Subgenre of war film
- Superhero film – Film genre revolving around superheroes
- Supernatural film – Film genre
- Surf film – Film genre
- Surrealist cinema – Film genre
- Survival film – Film genre depicting survival efforts
- Swashbuckler film – Subgenre of the adventure film genre
- Sword-and-sandal – Genre of epic films
- Tech noir – Hybrid genre of fiction, combining film noir and science fiction
- Teen film – Film genre
- Telefoni Bianchi – Italian film genre
- Tendency film – Socially conscious and left-leaning Japanese film genre
- Thriller film – Film genre evoking excitement and suspense
- Training film – Educational film genre
- Transgressive art – Art that intends to outrage or violate basic morals and sensibilities
- Travel documentary – Documentary film, television program or online series that describes travel
- Trial film – Legal drama film centered on a trial
- Trick film – Short silent films designed to feature innovative special effects
- Trümmerfilm – Film genre
- Ukrainian poetic cinema – Genre of Ukrainian cinema
- Underground film – Genre of film outside the mainstream
- Utopian and dystopian fiction – Genres of literature that explore social and political structures
- Vampire film – Film genre
- Vansploitation – Term and film genre used to describe American independent films from the 1970s
- Vigilante film – Film genre based on revenge theme
- Visual album – Type of concept album
- Vomit gore – Surreal horror film series by Lucifer Valentine
- War film – Film genre depicting wars
- Werewolf fiction – Fantasy genre
- Western (genre) – Multimedia genre
- Western film – Film genre
- Wiener Film – Austrian film genre
- Wire fu – Mix of Chinese martial arts and cinematic visual effects
- Woman's film – Film genre
- Women in prison film – Film genre
- Wuxia – Genre of Chinese fiction
- Yakuza film – Film genre
- Z movie – Category of low-budget films
- Zombie comedy – Film and television genre
- Zombie film – Subgenre of horror film featuring zombies
- Zombie pornography – Pornography involving zombies

== History of film and television ==
- Block booking
- Camera obscura
- Thomas Edison
- Intertitle – prior to the days of sound film, intertitles (cards with text inserted into the scene) represented dialogue or descriptive/narrative material
- Magic lantern
- Motion Picture Patents Company
- Phantasmagoria
- Silent film
- Zoetrope – one of several pre-film animation devices which produced the illusion of movement, most popular in the mid- to late 1800s

== General film concepts ==
Film theory

- Academy Awards – an American awards show hosted by the Academy of Motion Pictures Arts and Sciences which recognizes excellence in cinematic achievement, as voted for by the academy itself. The statuettes handed out to winners are nicknamed "Oscars".
- Actor
- American Film Institute
- B movie
- Cinematography
- Celebrity
- Cinematic techniques
- Direct-to-video
- Digital distribution
- Film directing
- Film distribution
- Film distributor
- Film editing
- Film budget
- Film finance
- Film studio
- Film screening
- Film promotion
- Home cinema
- Leading actor
- Movie projector
- Movie star
- Physical media
- Set construction
- Superstar
- Sound stage
- Television studio

=== Film formats ===
- List of film formats
- Timeline of video formats
- Home video
  - List of home video companies

== Films and TV series ==
- Lists of films
- Lists of television programs
- Lists of television specials
- Lists of animation

== Media Industry ==
- List of film production companies
- List of film distributors by country
- List of television production companies
- List of anime companies
- List of animation distribution companies
- List of animation studios
  - List of animation studios owned by NBCUniversal
  - List of animation studios owned by Paramount Skydance
  - List of animation studios owned by Sony
  - List of animation studios owned by the Walt Disney Company
  - List of animation studios owned by Warner Bros. Discovery
  - List of Japanese animation studios
- List of film archives
- List of cable television companies
- List of home video companies
- List of online video platforms
- List of pornography companies
- List of pornographic film studios
- List of satellite television companies
- List of streaming media services
- Lists of television channels
  - List of television networks by country
- List of assets owned by Amazon MGM Studios
- List of assets owned by AMC Networks
- List of assets owned by Comcast
- List of assets owned by Fox Corporation
- List of assets owned by Paramount Skydance
- List of assets owned by Sony
- List of assets owned by Starz Entertainment
- List of assets owned by the Walt Disney Company
- List of assets owned by Warner Bros. Discovery
- List of libraries owned by Comcast
- List of libraries owned by Metro-Goldwyn-Mayer
- List of libraries owned by Paramount Skydance
- List of libraries owned by Sony
- List of libraries owned by the Walt Disney Company
- List of libraries owned by Warner Bros. Discovery
- List of libraries owned by WildBrain

== Awards and festivals ==
- List of film awards
- List of film festivals
- List of Academy Awards ceremonies
- AFI 100 Years... series
- List of Golden Globe Awards ceremonies

== Professions related to films (Film crew) ==
=== Above the line ===
Above the line – Term in filmmaking

- Actor – Person who portrays a character in a production
- Pornographic film actor – Person who performs in pornography
  - Voice actor – Performing voice-overs to a character or provide information
  - Leading actor – Actor playing a main role
  - Supporting actor – Actor who performs a less-important role than that of the leading actor
  - Ensemble cast – Cast with many actors given similar standing
  - Character actor – Actor who predominantly plays distinctive or eccentric characters
  - Bit actor – Small acting role
  - Cameo actor – Brief appearance in performing art
- Film director – Person who controls the artistic and dramatic aspects of a film production
- Screenwriter – Person who writes for films, TV shows, comics, and games
- Film producer – Person supervising the making of a film
  - Executive producer – Profession
  - Line producer – Film/TV producer that handles logistics

=== Below the line ===
Below the line – Section of film budget

==== Pre-production ====
Pre-production – Phase of producing a film or television show

- Unit production manager – Responsible for the administration of a feature film or television production
- Production coordinator – Position in video or film production
- Production accountant – Opaque or creative accounting methods
- Assistant director – Film management and logistics role
- Script supervisor – Member of a film crew that oversees the continuity of scenes during filmmaking
- Script coordinator – Role in a film/TV crew who produces script drafts
- Casting director – Selection of actors or performers for a role
- Production assistant – Person responsible for various aspects of a film or TV production
- Location manager – Person responsible for locations where a movie is shot
- Location scout – Filmmaking and commercial photography production process
- Storyboard artist – Person who creates storyboards for advertising agencies and film productions

==== Production design ====
- Production designer – Person responsible for the overall look of a filmed event
  - Art director – Supervisor of an artistic production
- Costume designer – Person who designs costumes for a film, stage production or television show
- Greensman
- Hairdresser – Person whose occupation is to cut or style hair
- Make-up artist – Artist who applies makeup and prosthetics
- Set decorator – Person in charge of the set dressing on a film
- Set dresser – Worker who prepares a set with props and furniture
- Property master – Person overseeing props for a production
- Weapons master – Person responsible for weapon care and safety on a film set
- Matte painter – Film making technique
- Illustrator – Artist enhancing writing with images
- Scenic design – Creation of theatrical or film scenery

==== Photography ====
Principal photography – Phase of producing a film or television show in which the bulk of shooting takes place

- Cinematographer / director of photography – Creative head of a motion picture's camera and lighting decisions
- Camera operator – Professional operator of a film or video camera
  - Focus puller – Occupation in filmmaking
  - Clapper loader – Member of a motion picture filming crew
  - Steadicam – Motion picture camera stabilizer mounts
- Digital imaging technician – Job in the motion picture industry
- Second unit – Filmmaking team
- Gaffer – Chief lighting technician in film and TV
  - Best boy electric – Film crew position overseeing lighting or grips
  - Lighting technician – Occupation
- Key grip – Person in charge of grip crews and equipment management
  - Best boy grip – Film crew position overseeing lighting or grips
  - Dolly grip – Cinematography technician who operates the camera dolly
  - Grip – Camera supporting equipment technician

==== Sound design ====
Sound design – Sound track creation

- Director of audiography – Sound director, Head of a sound department
- Production sound mixer – Member of a film crew or television crew
- Boom operator – Profession for microphone pole placement
- Utility sound technician – Filmmaking occupation
- Dialogue editor
- Re-recording mixer – Post-production audio engineer
- Foley artist – Addition of sound effects to visual media
- Composer – Person who writes music
- Music supervisor – Person who combines music and visual media
- Music editor – Sound editor
- Orchestrator – Study or practice of writing music for an orchestra

==== Special effect ====
Special effect – Illusions or tricks to change appearances

- Special effects supervisor
- Visual effects supervisor – Filmmaker responsible for visual effects

==== Animation ====
Animation – Team in a film studio that works on animation

- Animator – Person who makes animation sequences out of still images
- Visual effects – Various processes by which imagery is created
- Modeling – Theoretical framework
- Rigging – Computer animation technique
- Layout artist

==== Talent ====
- Acting coach – Teacher who trains performers
- Body double – Actor who substitutes for another in a scene
- Dialect coach – Person who trains actors to speak with authentic accents
- Movement director
- Choreographer – Art of designing motion of physical bodies
- Extra – Nonspeaking or nonsinging acting role
- Talent agent – Person who represents the interests of entertainment, broadcast, and sports professionals
- Stand-in – Substitute for an actor for production purposes
- Acting instructor – Teacher who trains performers
- Intimacy coordinator – Worker in film and television productions
- Stage combat – Technique used in theatre to create the illusion of physical combat
- Stunt double – Actor who substitutes for another in a scene
- Stunt performer – Person who performs stunts
- Under-five – TV or film actor whose character has fewer than five lines of dialogue

==== Post-production ====
Post-production – Step in film, video, audio or photography process

- Film editor – Creative and technical part of the post-production process of filmmaking
- Sound editor – Creative professional
- Colorist – Enhancing the color of an image or video
- Animator – Person who makes animation sequences out of still images
- Technical director – Occupation
- VFX creative director – Visual effects person
- Visual effects editor – Various processes by which imagery is created
- Compositor – Combining of visual elements from separate sources into single images

==== Other ====
- Swing gang – People who make last-minute changes on a film set
- Unit still photographer – Filmmaking occupation

== Notable people from the film industry ==
- Show business families
- Soundtrack composers

=== Film theorists and critics ===
- Rudolf Arnheim – German author and theorist (1904 – 2007)
- Béla Balázs – Hungarian film critic, aesthetician, writer and poet
- Roland Barthes – French philosopher and essayist (1915–1980)
- André Bazin – French film critic (1918–1958)
- David Bordwell – American film scholar (1947–2024)
- Vincent Canby – American film and theatre critic (1924–2000)
- Gilles Deleuze – French philosopher (1925–1995)
- Louis Delluc – French film director (1890–1924)
- Germaine Dulac – French film director and producer
- Roger Ebert – American film critic and author (1942–2013)
- Sergei Eisenstein – Soviet-Russian filmmaker and theorist (1898–1948)
- Jean Epstein – French film director, essayist and novelist
- Jean-Luc Godard – French and Swiss film director (1930–2022)
- Pauline Kael – American film critic (1919–2001)
- Stanley Kauffmann – American author, editor, and critic (1916–2013)
- Siegfried Kracauer – German writer (1889–1966)
- Lev Kuleshov – Soviet filmmaker and film theorist
- Christian Metz – French film theorist (1931–1993)
- Laura Mulvey – British feminist film theorist (born 1941)
- Vladimir Propp – Russian and Soviet folklorist (1895–1970)
- Vsevolod Pudovkin – Soviet-Russian film director, screenwriter and actor
- Vivian Sobchack – American film critic (born 1940)
- Dziga Vertov – Soviet-Jewish filmmaker (1896–1954)

=== Famous film producers ===
Notable film producers

- George Lucas – American filmmaker and entrepreneur (born 1944)
- David O. Selznick – American film producer (1902–1965)
- Jerry Bruckheimer – American film and television producer (born 1943)

=== Notable directors ===
- List of notable film and television directors
- List of pornographic film directors
- Chantal Akerman – Belgian film director, screenwriter, and educator (1950–2015)
- Woody Allen – American filmmaker and actor (born 1935)
- Pedro Almodovar – Spanish filmmaker (born 1949)
- Robert Altman – American filmmaker (1925–2006)
- Theo Angelopoulos – Greek film director, screenwriter and film producer (1935–2012)
- Michelangelo Antonioni – Italian filmmaker (1912–2007)
- Richard Attenborough – English actor and film director (1923–2014)
- Ingmar Bergman – Swedish filmmaker (1918–2007)
- Bernardo Bertolucci – Italian filmmaker (1941–2018)
- Kathryn Bigelow – American filmmaker (born 1951)
- Bong Joon-Ho – South Korean filmmaker (born 1969)
- Robert Bresson – French filmmaker (1901–1999)
- Clarence Brown – American film director (1890–1987)
- Tod Browning – American film director (1880–1962)
- Luis Buñuel – Spanish-Mexican filmmaker (1900–1983)
- James Cameron – Canadian and New Zealand filmmaker and explorer (born 1954)
- Frank Capra – Italian-born American film director (1897–1991)
- Marcel Carné – French film director (1906–1996)
- John Carpenter – American filmmaker (born 1948)
- John Cassavetes – American filmmaker and actor (1929–1989)
- Nuri Bilge Ceylan – Turkish film director, screenwriter, film producer and photographer (born 1959)
- Claude Chabrol – French film director (1930–2010)
- Youssef Chahine – Egyptian film director (1926–2008)
- Park Chan-wook – South Korean filmmaker (born 1963)
- Charles Chaplin – English actor and filmmaker (1889–1977)
- Chen Kaige – Chinese filmmaker (born 1952)
- Yash Chopra – Indian filmmaker (1932–2012)
- René Clair – French filmmaker and writer (1898–1981)
- Henri-Georges Clouzot – French film director (1907–1977)
- Jean Cocteau – French writer and film director (1889–1963)
- Joel and Ethan Coen – American filmmakers
- Francis Ford Coppola – American filmmaker (born 1939)
- Pedro Costa – Portuguese film director
- Alfonso Cuarón – Mexican filmmaker (born 1961)
- George Cukor – American film director and producer (1899–1983)
- Michael Curtiz – Hungarian and American director (1886–1962)
- Cecil B. DeMille – American filmmaker and actor (1881–1959)
- Vittorio De Sica – Italian film director and actor (1901–1974)
- Carl Dreyer – Danish film director (1889–1968)
- Guru Dutt – Indian filmmaker and actor (1925–1964)
- Clint Eastwood – American actor and filmmaker (born 1930)
- Sergei Einstein – Soviet-Russian filmmaker and theorist (1898–1948)
- Victor Erice – Spanish film director (born 1940)
- Asghar Farhadi – Iranian film director and screenwriter (born 1972)
- Rainer Werner Fassbinder – German filmmaker (1945–1982)
- Federico Fellini – Italian filmmaker (1920–1993)
- Robert J. Flaherty – American documentary filmmaker
- David Fincher – American filmmaker (born 1962)
- Victor Fleming – American film director, cinematographer, and producer (1889–1949)
- John Ford – American film director (1894–1973)
- Milos Forman – Czech and American film director (1932–2018)
- Bob Fosse – American choreographer, dancer, and director (1927–1987)
- Jesús Franco – Spanish filmmaker, composer, and actor (1930–2013)
- Abel Gance – French film director and producer
- Ritwik Ghatak – Indian Bengali filmmaker and script writer (1925–1976)
- Jean-Luc Godard – French and Swiss film director (1930–2022)
- Miguel Gomes – Portuguese film director (born 1972)
- Adoor Gopalakrishnan – Indian filmmaker and screenwriter (born 1941)
- D. W. Griffith – American filmmaker (1875–1948)
- Howard Hawks – American film director (1896–1977)
- Werner Herzog – German director, producer, screenwriter (born 1942)
- Alfred Hitchcock – English filmmaker (1899–1980)
- John Huston – American-Irish filmmaker and actor (1906–1987)
- Im Kwon-taek – South Korean film director (born 1934)
- Shōhei Imamura – Japanese film director (1926–2006)
- Peter Jackson – New Zealand filmmaker (born 1961)
- Miklós Jancsó – Hungarian film director and screenwriter (1921–2014)
- Jia Zhangke – Chinese film director and screenwriter (born 1970)
- Alejandro Jodorowsky – Chilean and French filmmaker (born 1929)
- Elia Kazan – Greek-American theatre director and filmmaker (1909–2003)
- Abbas Kiarostami – Iranian filmmaker (1941–2016)
- Kim Ki-duk – South Korean film director (1960–2020)
- Krzysztof Kieślowski – Polish film director and screenwriter (1941–1996)
- Stanley Kramer – American film director and producer (1913–2001)
- Stanley Kubrick – American filmmaker and photographer (1928–1999)
- Akira Kurosawa – Japanese filmmaker (1910–1998)
- Fritz Lang – Austrian filmmaker (1890–1976)
- Ang Lee – Taiwanese filmmaker (born 1954)
- David Lean – English filmmaker and editor (1908–1991)
- Spike Lee – American filmmaker and actor (born 1957)
- Sergio Leone – Italian filmmaker (1929–1989)
- Ken Loach – English retired filmmaker (born 1936)
- Ernst Lubitsch – German and American film director (1892–1947)
- Sidney Lumet – American filmmaker (1924–2011)
- David Lynch – American filmmaker (1946–2025)
- Louis Malle – French filmmaker (1932–1995)
- Mohsen Makhmalbaf – Iranian film director, writer, editor, and producer
- Joseph L. Mankiewicz – American filmmaker (1909–1993)
- Leo McCarey – American film director (1898–1969)
- Deepa Mehta – Indian-born Canadian film director and screenwriter (born 1950)
- Jean-Pierre Melville – French filmmaker and actor (1917–1973)
- Brillante Mendoza – Filipino independent filmmaker
- Vincente Minnelli – American stage and film director (1903–1986)
- Kenji Mizoguchi – Japanese filmmaker (1898–1956)
- Joao Cesar Monteiro – Portuguese film director, actor, writer, and film critic
- F. W. Murnau – German film director (1888–1931)
- Mira Nair – Indian American filmmaker (born 1957)
- Mike Nichols – American film and theatre director (1931–2014)
- Christopher Nolan – British and American filmmaker (born 1970)
- Manoel de Oliveira – Portuguese film director, screenwriter and racing driver (1908–2015)
- Max Ophüls – German-French film director (1902–1957)
- Nagisa Oshima – Japanese filmmaker (1932–2013)
- Yasujiro Ozu – Japanese filmmaker (1903–1963)
- Georg Wilhelm Pabst – Austrian film director (1885–1967)
- Sergei Parajanov – Soviet filmmaker (1924–1990)
- Alan Parker – English filmmaker (1944–2020)
- Pier Paolo Pasolini – Italian writer, filmmaker, poet, and intellectual (1922–1975)
- Sam Peckinpah – American filmmaker (1925–1984)
- Dadasaheb Phalke – Indian film producer, director and screenwriter (1870–1944)
- Roman Polanski – Polish and French filmmaker (born 1933)
- Michael Powell/Emeric Pressburger – English film director (1905–1990)
- Otto Preminger – Austrian-American director, producer, and actor (1905–1986)
- Vsevolod Pudovkin – Soviet-Russian film director, screenwriter and actor
- Nicholas Ray – American film director (1911–1979)
- Satyajit Ray – Indian filmmaker and writer (1921–1992)
- Jean Renoir – French filmmaker (1894–1979)
- Alain Resnais – French film director (1922–2014)
- Leni Riefenstahl – German filmmaker (1902–2003)
- Jacques Rivette – French film director, screenwriter and film critic
- Eric Rohmer – French film director (1920–2010)
- Roberto Rossellini – Italian film director (1906–1977)
- Ken Russell – British film director (1927–2011)
- Shadi Abdel Salam – Egyptian film director (1930–1986)
- Martin Scorsese – American filmmaker (born 1942)
- Ridley Scott – English filmmaker (born 1937)
- Tony Scott – English filmmaker (1944–2012)
- Ousmane Sembene – Senegalese film director, producer, screenwriter, actor and author (1923–2007)
- Mrinal Sen – Indian film director (1923–2018)
- Eduardo Serra – Portuguese cinematographer (1943–2025)
- Douglas Sirk – German film director (1897–1987)
- Steven Spielberg – American filmmaker (born 1946)
- Konstantin Stanislavski – Russian actor and theatre director (1863–1938)
- Josef von Sternberg – Austrian-American film director (1894–1969)
- Oliver Stone – American filmmaker (born 1946)
- Eric von Stroheim – Austrian-American actor and director (1885–1957)
- Quentin Tarantino – American filmmaker (born 1963)
- Andrei Tarkovsky – Soviet filmmaker (1932–1986)
- Jacques Tati – French filmmaker and actor (1907–1982)
- Guillermo del Toro – Mexican filmmaker (born 1964)
- Tran Anh Hung – Vietnamese-French filmmaker
- Lars von Trier – Danish filmmaker (born 1956)
- François Truffaut – French filmmaker (1932–1984)
- Roger Vadim – French filmmaker (1928–2000)
- Agnès Varda – French filmmaker and photographer (1928–2019)
- Paul Verhoeven – Dutch filmmaker (born 1938)
- Dziga Vertov – Soviet-Jewish filmmaker (1896–1954)
- King Vidor – American writer and director (1894–1982)
- Jean Vigo – French film director (1905–1934)
- Luchino Visconti – Italian theatre, opera, and cinema director (1906-1976)
- Andrzej Wajda – Polish film director (1926–2016)
- Apichatpong Weerasethakul – Thai film director (born 1970)
- Orson Welles – American actor and filmmaker (1915–1985)
- William Wellman – American filmmaker (1896–1975)
- Wim Wenders – German filmmaker (born 1945)
- James Whale – English film director (1889–1957)
- Billy Wilder – Austrian and American filmmaker (1906–2002)
- Robert Wise – American film director, film producer and film editor (1914–2005)
- Wong Kar-wai – Hong Kong filmmaker (born 1958)
- Sam Wood – American director, producer, and actor
- William Wyler – German-born American film director (1902–1981)
- Ozu Yasujiro – Japanese filmmaker (1903–1963)
- Zhang Yimou – Chinese filmmaker
- Robert Zemeckis – American filmmaker (born 1951)
- Fred Zinnemann – American film director (1907–1997)

=== Famous actors ===
- Notable actors
- Outline of acting
- Woody Allen – American filmmaker and actor (born 1935)
- Fred Astaire – American dancer and actor (1899–1987)
- Lauren Bacall – American actress (1924–2014)
- Amitabh Bachchan – Indian actor (born 1942)
- Ingrid Bergman – Swedish actress (1915–1982)
- Humphrey Bogart – American actor (1899–1957)
- Marlon Brando – American actor (1924–2004)
- Richard Burton – Welsh actor (1925–1984)
- James Cagney – American actor and dancer (1899–1986)
- Lon Chaney, Sr. – American actor (1883–1930)
- Charles Chaplin – English actor and filmmaker (1889–1977)
- Gary Cooper – American actor (1901–1961)
- Julie Christie – British actress (born 1940)
- Joan Crawford – American actress (1904?–1977)
- Russell Crowe – New Zealand–born actor (born 1964)
- Tom Cruise – American actor and film producer (born 1962)
- Bette Davis – American actress (1908–1989)
- Daniel Day-Lewis – English actor (born 1957)
- James Dean – American actor (1931–1955)
- Olivia de Havilland – British actress (1916–2020)
- Leonardo DiCaprio – American actor (born 1974)
- Kirk Douglas – American actor and filmmaker (1916–2020)
- Clint Eastwood – American actor and filmmaker (born 1930)
- Douglas Fairbanks, Sr. – American actor and filmmaker (1883–1939)
- W.C. Fields – American comedian, actor, juggler and writer (1880–1946)
- Joan Fontaine – British-American actress (1917–2013)
- Clark Gable – American actor (1901–1960)
- Greta Garbo – Swedish and American actress (1905–1990)
- Judy Garland – American actress and singer (1922–1969)
- Dorothy Gish – American actress (1898–1968)
- Lillian Gish – American actress (1893–1993)
- Cary Grant – British-American actor (1904–1986)
- Alec Guinness – English actor (1914–2000)
- Gene Hackman – American actor (1930–2025)
- Tom Hanks – American actor and filmmaker (born 1956)
- Audrey Hepburn – British actress (1929–1993)
- Katharine Hepburn – American actress (1907–2003)
- Charlton Heston – American actor (1923–2008)
- William Holden – American actor (1918–1981)
- Anthony Hopkins – Welsh actor (born 1937)
- Boris Karloff – English actor (1887–1969)
- Buster Keaton – American actor and filmmaker (1895–1966)
- Angela Lansbury – British actress and singer (1925–2022)
- Laurel and Hardy – English-American comedy duo
- Christopher Lee – English actor and singer (1922–2015)
- Vivien Leigh – British actress (1913–1967)
- Jack Lemmon – American actor (1925–2001)
- Peter Lorre – Hungarian and American actor (1904–1964)
- Myrna Loy – American actress (1905–1993)
- Fredric March – American actor (1897–1975)
- Walter Matthau – American actor (1920–2000)
- Steve McQueen – American actor (1930–1980)
- Marilyn Monroe – American actress and model (1926–1962)
- Michael Murphy – American film and television actor
- Paul Newman – American actor and filmmaker (1925–2008)
- Jack Nicholson – American actor and filmmaker (born 1937)
- Laurence Olivier – English actor and director (1907–1989)
- Peter O'Toole – English and Irish actor (1932–2013)
- Al Pacino – American actor (born 1940)
- Geraldine Page – American actress (1924–1987)
- Anthony Perkins – American actor (1932–1992)
- Sidney Poitier – Bahamian-American actor, filmmaker, diplomat and author (1927–2022)
- Oliver Reed – English actor (1938–1999)
- Burt Reynolds – American actor (1936–2018)
- Edward G. Robinson – American actor (1893–1973)
- Ginger Rogers – American actress, singer, and dancer (1911–1995)
- James Stewart – American actor and military officer (1908–1997)
- Meryl Streep – American actress (born 1949)
- Elizabeth Taylor – British and American actress (1932–2011)
- The Three Stooges – American slapstick comedy trio (1922–1970)
- Spencer Tracy – American actor (1900–1967)
- Denzel Washington – American actor (born 1954)
- John Wayne – American actor (1907–1979)
- Orson Welles – American actor and filmmaker (1915–1985)
- Shelley Winters – American actress (1920–2006)
- Joanne Woodward – American actress (born 1930)

== See also ==
- Film industry
- Filmmaking
- Independent film
- List of film festivals
- List of motion picture production equipment
- Outline of acting
- Outline of animation
- Outline of books
- Outline of communication
- Outline of culture
- Outlines of culture and arts
- Outline of dance
- Outline of entertainment
- Outline of human sexuality
- Outline of the Internet
- Outline of knowledge
- Outline of literature
- Outline of music
- Outline of performing arts
- Outline of photography
- Outline of radio
- Outline of sports
- Outline of technology
- Outline of telecommunication
- Outline of television broadcasting
- Outline of theatre
- Outline of video games
- Outline of the visual arts
