= Outline of animation =

Method of creating moving pictures

The following outline is provided as an overview of and topical guide to animation:

Animation is a filmmaking technique whereby pictures are created or manipulated and then played in sequence to create the illusion of moving images. In traditional animation, images are drawn or painted by hand on transparent celluloid sheets to be photographed and exhibited on film. Animation has been recognised as an artistic medium, specifically within the entertainment industry. Many animations are either traditional animations or computer animations made with computer-generated imagery (CGI). Stop motion animation, in particular claymation, is also prominent alongside these other forms, albeit to a lesser degree.

== What type of thing is animation? ==
Animation can be described as all of the following:

- One of the visual arts
- Manipulation of imagery to give the appearance of movement

== Animation techniques ==
- Animation
  - Cel animation (= traditional animation)
    - Full animation
    - Limited animation
    - Rotoscoping
  - Stop motion
    - Puppet animation
      - Puppetoons
    - Claymation (= clay animation)
      - Strata-cut animation
    - Cutout animation
      - Silhouette animation
    - Model animation
      - Go motion
    - Object animation
      - Brickfilm
      - Graphic animation
    - Pixilation
  - Computer animation
    - Anime
    - Categorization by dimensionality of characters:
      - 2D animation
      - 3D animation
    - Categorization by speed of rendering and capabilities:
      - Pre-rendered animation: Motion is developed in the software. There is a delay for the software to render the animation before it can be viewed.
        - Talking avatar: The user provides or selects a picture of a character and provides a recording of a voice. The software animates lip movements, facial expressions, and small hand and body motions in the character that remains upright and stationary.
          - Examples of software: HeyGen Photo Avatar, Aitubo Talking Avatar, Kreado AI, D-ID, Gooey AI Lipsync Maker, Adobe Express Animate from audio
        - Video from text: The user provides a text description of a desired motion, possibly along with other guiding inputs, such as a starting image, a video to transform, or a soundtrack to match. The software interprets the description, influenced by any additional inputs, and generates an animated video from it.
          - Examples of software: Raw Shorts, Kaiber, Elai, Pika Labs, Gooey AI AI Animation Generator, Neural Frames, GenMo
        - Video from image: The user provides an image file, which the software uses as the starting point to generate an animated video.
          - Example of software: Pika Labs, LeiaPix, Meta AI Animated Drawings,
        - Motion imitation: The user provides an existing video showing the motion of a person and selects or creates a character. The software makes the character imitate the actions of the person in the video, including facial expressions, hand gestures, walking, and dancing.
          - Example of software: DeepMotion
        - Full motion: The software can generate an unlimited range and duration of motion based on designs developed by the user.
          - Examples of software: Maya, Blender, Adobe Animate, Reallusion Cartoon Animator (2D)
      - Real-time animation (= machinima): Motion develops in the software in response to user input. The animation is displayed nearly simultaneously with the input.
        - Video game
          - Examples of video game engines: Unity, Unreal Engine, CryEngine
        - Virtual world (= simulation game)
          - Examples: Second Life, The Sims
        - Other real-time animation:
          - Examples of software: iClone, Adobe Character Animator (2D), Toon Boom Harmony, Blender

== History of animation ==
- History of American animation:
  - Animation in the United States during the silent era
  - Golden age of American animation
  - World War II and American animation
  - Animation in the United States in the television era
  - Modern animation in the United States
- History of anime
  - History of anime in the United States
- History of animation in India
- History of British animation
- History of Canadian animation
- History of Chinese animation
- History of French animation
- History of Hungarian animation
- History of Iranian animation
- History of Korean animation
- History of Russian animation

== Computer Animation Software ==
- 2D animation
  - Adobe Flash
  - FlipaClip
- 3D animation
  - Autodesk Maya
  - Autodesk 3ds Max
  - LightWave 3D
  - ZBrush
  - Rhinoceros 3D
  - Cinema 4D
  - Houdini (software)
  - Blender (software)
  - Autodesk Softimage

== Animated films and TV series ==
- Lists of animated films
  - Lists of animated television series
  - List of animated short films
  - List of theatrical animated short film series
  - Lists of anime
  - List of animated Internet series
  - List of animated direct-to-video series
  - List of live-action films based on cartoons and comics
  - List of films with live action and animation
  - List of animated films in the public domain in the United States
  - List of lost or unfinished animated films
  - List of animated package films
  - List of adult animated feature films
  - List of children's animated films
  - List of years in animation

== Animation Industry ==
- List of animation studios
  - List of animation studios owned by NBCUniversal
  - List of animation studios owned by Paramount Skydance
  - List of animation studios owned by Sony
  - List of animation studios owned by the Walt Disney Company
  - List of animation studios owned by Warner Bros. Discovery
  - List of animation distribution companies

== Some notable artists and producers of animation ==
- Tex Avery
- Ralph Bakshi
- Hanna-Barbera
- Brad Bird
- Don Bluth
- Bob Clampett
- Quirino Cristiani
- Walt Disney
- Max Fleischer
- Paul Grimault
- Matt Groening
- Ivan Ivanov-Vano
- Chuck Jones
- Mike Judge
- John Kricfalusi
- Walter Lantz
- John Lasseter
- Todd McFarlane
- Hayao Miyazaki
- Joe Murray
- Fred Quimby
- Trey Parker
- Matt Stone
- Jay Ward

== See also ==
- Outline of film
- Outlines of culture and arts
