= Gurav =

Occupational community comprising several castes

The Gurav (also spelled Gurava or Guru) are a traditional service and priestly community, who serve in Hindu temples to Ganesha, Hanuman, Shiva and Gramadevata, in Karnataka, Maharashtra, Andhra Pradesh, and other states in western and southern India. They historically perform religious and temple-related duties, including serving as temple priests (pujaris), caretakers, musicians, and participants in rituals.

The other occupations of the gurav include making and selling "leaf-plates", and selling "flower", "Bel leaves" the guravs also play music for patrons. Gurav are also family priests to devadis. the traditional female temple dancer. The community is composed of several subgroups, including Lingayat Gurav, Saiva Gurav, and Bhavika Gurav, with each subgroup observing distinct ritual practices.

Maharashtrian Brahmins classify the Gurav's as Shudras, however, they have historically granted them custodianship of temples. In Karnataka, the Gurav community is categorized under "Category-I" of the Other Backward Classes (OBC) list for state-level reservations. This classification provides them access to reservation benefits in education and employment within the state. In Maharashtra, many Gurav are listed as Other Backward Classes (OBC) under state government notifications, Their identity, roles, and social status reflect a complex interplay of religion, caste, and local traditions.

== Function ==
Both Gurav women and men perform the traditional occupations of their community. They are neither cultivators nor village officers but rather providers of a service deemed necessary for the functioning of the village, as with artisans. (Note: In the state of Maharashtra, the traditional village service providers are known as balutedhars and the system by which they are paid as balute. There are commonly twelve such groups of people, although it may be more or less, and they include occupations such as carpenters, cobblers, potters and oil-pressers. They are distinct from the cultivators and the officers among the village people. The terms of payment of balute differ from those of the jajmani system.) They traditionally serve as priests, maintainers and managers in temples devoted to Shiva, mostly in the southern states of Andhra Pradesh, Karnataka and Maharashtra. Some act in a role similar to shamans, being intermediaries between the temple idol and the soliciting believer, and serve as priests in village temples. Their other traditional roles are also connected to Shaivite worship, such as musicianship and the sale both of leaf plates and symbolic flowers. Local testimony suggests that the Gurav also act in a religious capacity outside temple grounds: at harvest time in the Mawal region, they are called upon to provide a symbolic sprinkling of water at threshing grounds

== Composition ==
The Bhavika, (Note: The Bhavika Gurav are also known as Konkani Gurav.) Lingayat and Saiva are the most prominent among the distinct endogamous castes that comprise the Gurav. These groups are in turn subdivided; for example, the Saiva Gurav have Nagari, Nilakantha and Swayambhu as subcastes, while the Lingayat Gurav are split into the Hugara, Jira and Malgara.

=== Bhavika Gurav ===
The Bhavika Guravs are concentrated mainly in the Konkan region. They traditionally serve as priests at shrines of village deities (Grāmadevatās), which are often simple structures located on the outskirts of villages. Historically, most members were not literate and had little formal education or ritual training. They are generally associated with the Kunbi-caste and, in some cases, perform animal sacrifices during local folk festivals.

=== Lingayat Gurav ===
The Lingayat Gurav are found mainly in the Konkan region and on the borders between Maharashtra and Karnataka. They do not know from which caste they originate but claim to have migrated to their present regions from Karnataka when they suffered persecution after the death of Basavanna, the founder of Lingayat. They are strict vegetarians and believe their high degree of devotion to Shiva makes them superior to other Gurav subgroups. It is this zeal that also causes them to disdain being grouped with other castes. Lingayat Gurav are split into the Hugara, Jira and Malgara.

=== Shaiva Gurav ===
According to Jayant Bhalchandra Bapat, a Hindu priest and academic, although the Lingayat Gurav believe themselves to be superior among the various Gurav subgroups, it is the Shaiva Gurav who are most respected by the people of Maharashtra. As they belongs to Shaiva category. The members of this sub-community perform a sacred thread ceremony in accordance with Shaiva traditions.

Mostly literate and educated, the Maharashtrian members of the Shaiva Gurav developed a myth of origin in the early 19th century and prefer to call themselves Shaiva. Their self-published research, in the form of a clan history known as a jatipurana, proposes a lineal connection with the sage Dadhichi through his son Sudarsana and thus a status. The legend says that Sudarsana was stripped of certain Vedic powers by an offended Shiva but was also granted the right to perform the puja rituals. The claims of the community to Brahminhood were accepted both by a sankaracharya (a respected authority and arbitrator of the Hindu faith) and colonial law courts but are not accepted in general Maharashtrian society, In Maharashtra Shaiva Gurav offer the first daily puja to almost all Ganesha Temples and Shiva Temples.

== Socio-economic status ==
Brahmins classify the Gurav's as shudras but grant them custodianships of the shiva temples. The sociologist M. N. Srinivas noted this peculiarity of low-status Brahminhood in particular regarding the Tapodhan of Gujarat. In Maharashtra they are considered to be a Shaiva community in the Hindu ritual ranking system known as varna.

It is probable that the Gurav were less, that's why considered among the various balutedhar communities. They are not among those groups who have noticeably suffered historically from the effects of social degradation or lack of access to opportunity, although in Maharashtra they are listed among the Other Backward Classes under India's system of positive discrimination.
