= Outlines of culture and arts =

The following outlines are provided as overviews of and topical guides to culture and art.

== A ==
- Outline of acting
- Outline of aesthetics
- Outline of animation

== C ==
- Outline of communication
- Outline of crafts
- Outline of cuisines
- Outline of culture

== D ==
- Outline of dance
- Outline of design
- Outline of drawing and drawings

== E ==
- Outline of entertainment

== F ==
- Outline of fantasy
- Outline of festivals
- Outline of fiction
- Outline of film

== G ==
- Outline of games

== H ==
- Outline of human sexuality

== I ==
- Outline of the Internet

== L ==
- Outline of literature

== M ==
- Outline of music

== O ==
- Outline of opera

== P ==
- Outline of painting
- Outline of painting history
- Outline of performing arts
- Outline of photography
- Outline of poetry

== R ==
- Outline of radio

== S ==
- Outline of science fiction
- Outline of sculpture
- Outline of sports
- Outline of stagecraft

== T ==
- Outline of technology
- Outline of telecommunication
- Outline of television broadcasting
- Outline of theatre

== V ==
- Outline of video games
- Outline of the visual arts
