= Badaga =

Badaga may refer to:

- Badagas, an indigenous people inhabiting the Nilgiri Hills of Tamil Nadu, India
- Badaga language, a Dravidian language spoken by the Badagas
- Badaga cinema, the Badaga-language film industry based in Udagamandalam or Ooty in Tamil Nadu, India
- Badaganadu, a Brahmin community that resides primarily in Karnataka, India
