= Canovaccio =

Scenario used by commedia dell'arte players

A canovaccio is a scenario used by commedia dell'arte players. It consisted only of a list of acts and scenes; the details were left to the improvisation of the actors. Actors in the commedia dell'arte thus had to be endowed with an inventive mind since the success of the play depended largely on their creativity and above all on their lazzi (jokes and gags). The spotlight fell on the actors rather than on the play itself.

The use of improvisation on top of canovaccio enabled the avoidance of censorship because censors cannot censor that which is not written. Since the dialogue was almost entirely improvised on stage, actors and theatre companies could get away with almost anything.

In the late 19th century scholars began searching for documentary sources on the history of the theatre in Italy. Over a thousand documents in manuscript or print were discovered that consisted of canovacci in numerous collections or individually, and usually anonymous.
