= Outline of acting =

Story telling by enacting a character

The following outline is provided as an overview of and topical guide to acting:

Acting – work of an actor or actress, which is a person in theatre, television, film, or any other storytelling medium who tells the story by portraying a character and, usually, speaking or singing the written text or play.

== What type of thing is acting? ==
Acting can be described as all of the following:

- one of the arts –
  - a performing art – form of art in which artists use their voices, bodies or inanimate objects to convey artistic expression. It is different from visual arts, which is when artists use paint, canvas or various materials to create physical or static art objects. Performing arts include a range of disciplines which are performed in front of a live audience.

== Acting techniques ==
- Classical acting – philosophy of acting that integrates the expression of the body, voice, imagination, personalizing, improvisation, external stimuli, and script analysis. It is based on the theories and systems of select classical actors and directors including Konstantin Stanislavski and Michel Saint-Denis.
- Meisner technique – requires the actor to focus totally on the other actor as though he or she is real and they only exist in that moment. This is a method that makes the actors in the scene seem more authentic to the audience. It is based on the principle that acting finds its expression in people's response to other people and circumstances. It is based on Stanislavski's system.
- Method acting – range of techniques based on for training actors to achieve better characterizations of the characters they play, as formulated by Lee Strasberg. Strasberg's method is based upon the idea that in order to develop an emotional and cognitive understanding of their roles, actors should use their own experiences to identify personally with their characters. It is based on aspects of Stanislavski's system.
- Practical aesthetics – acting technique originally conceived by David Mamet and William H. Macy, based on the teachings of Stanislavsky, Sanford Meisner, and the Stoic philosopher Epictetus.
- Stanislavski's system – method in which actors draw upon their own feelings and experiences to convey the "truth" of the character they are portraying. The actor puts himself or herself in the mindset of the character finding things in common in order to give a more genuine portrayal of the character.

== History of acting ==
History of acting

- History of theatre
- History of classical acting

== Scholars on acting ==
- James Lipton

== Some famous actors ==
- Lists of actors
  - List of Asian Academy Award winners and nominees
  - List of Black Academy Award winners and nominees

=== Actors trained in the classical tradition ===
Some well-known classically trained actors include:

- Peggy Ashcroft
- Richard Attenborough
- Ethel Barrymore
- John Barrymore
- Lionel Barrymore
- Angela Bassett
- Alan Bates
- Cate Blanchett
- Dirk Bogarde
- Kenneth Branagh
- Richard Burton
- James Cagney
- Gwendoline Christie
- Frances Conroy
- Tom Courtenay
- Benedict Cumberbatch
- Timothy Dalton
- Bette Davis
- Judi Dench
- Robert Donat
- Chiwetel Ejiofor
- Edith Evans
- Joseph Fiennes
- Ralph Fiennes
- Albert Finney
- Kate Fleetwood
- John Gielgud
- Alec Guinness
- Richard Harris
- Rex Harrison
- Katharine Hepburn
- Tom Hiddleston
- Ian Holm
- Anthony Hopkins
- John Hurt
- Jeremy Irons
- Derek Jacobi
- Felicity Jones
- Dame Celia Johnson
- Boris Karloff
- Ben Kingsley
- Elsa Lanchester
- Angela Lansbury
- Charles Laughton
- Vivien Leigh
- John Lithgow
- Richard Madden
- James Mason
- James McAvoy
- Ian McKellen
- Helen Mirren
- Eve Myles
- Laurence Olivier
- David Oyelowo
- Christopher Plummer
- Pete Postlethwaite
- Sreejith Ramanan
- Basil Rathbone
- Corin Redgrave
- Lynn Redgrave
- Michael Redgrave
- Vanessa Redgrave
- Eddie Redmayne
- Ralph Richardson
- Alan Rickman
- Geoffrey Rush
- Margaret Rutherford
- Mark Rylance
- Alastair Sim
- Paul Scofield
- William Shatner
- Dame Maggie Smith
- Timothy Spall
- Patrick Stewart
- David Tennant
- Emma Thompson
- Sybil Thorndike
- Luke Treadaway
- Peter O'Toole
- Polly Walker
- David Warner
- Orson Welles
- May Whitty

=== Method actors ===
- James Dean
- Jane Fonda
- Dustin Hoffman
- Marilyn Monroe
- Paul Newman
- Jack Nicholson
- Al Pacino
- George Peppard
- Mickey Rourke

== Acting awards ==
- Academy Award for Best Actor
- Academy Award for Best Actress
- Academy Award for Best Supporting Actor
- Academy Award for Best Supporting Actress
- Academy Juvenile Award

== See also ==
- Outline of entertainment
- Outline of film
- Outline of theatre
