= Kshatriya =

Ruling and warrior class of the Hindu varna system

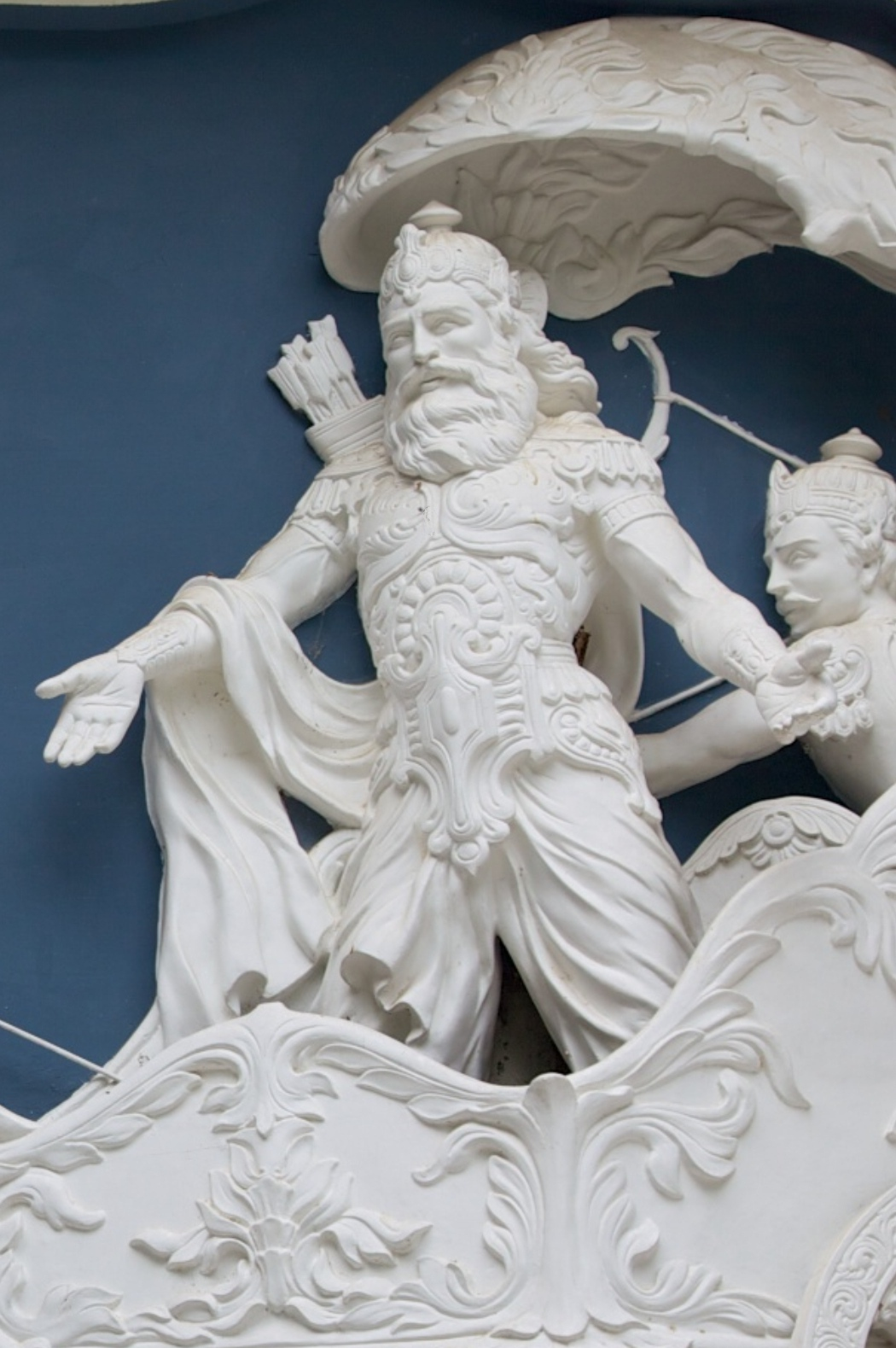
Bhishma, a kshatriya of the Lunar dynasty in Hindu literature.

Kshatriya (Sanskrit: क्षत्रिय, romanized: Kṣatriya) (from Sanskrit kṣatra, "rule, authority"; also called Rajanya) is one of the four varnas (social orders) of Hindu society and is associated with the warrior aristocracy. The Sanskrit term kṣatriyaḥ is used in the context of later Vedic society wherein members were organised into four classes: brahmin, kshatriya, vaishya, and shudra.

== History ==
=== Early Rigvedic tribal monarchy ===
The administrative machinery in Vedic India was headed by a tribal king called a Rajan whose position may or may not have been hereditary. The king may have been elected in a tribal assembly (called a Samiti), which included women. The Rajan protected the tribe and cattle; was assisted by a priest; and did not maintain a standing army, though in the later period the rulership appears to have risen as a social class. The concept of the fourfold varna system is not yet recorded.

=== Later Vedic period ===
The hymn Purusha Sukta in the Rigveda describes the symbolic creation of the four varnas through cosmic sacrifice (yajña). Some scholars consider the Purusha Sukta to be a late interpolation into the Rigveda based on the neological character of the composition, as compared to the more archaic style of the Vedic literature. Since not all Indians were fully regulated under varna paradigm in Vedic society, the Purusha Sukta was supposedly composed to secure Vedic sanction for the hereditary caste scheme. An alternate explanation is that the word Shudra does not occur anywhere else in the Rigveda except the Purusha Sukta, leading some scholars to believe the Purusha Sukta was a composition of the later Rigvedic period itself to denote, legitimise and sanctify an oppressive and exploitative class structure that had already come into existence.

Although the Purusha Sukta uses the term rajanya, not Kshatriya, it is considered the first instance in the extant Vedic texts where four social classes are mentioned for the first time together. Usage of the term Rajanya possibly indicates the 'kinsmen of the Rajan' (i.e., kinsmen of the ruler) had emerged as a distinct social group then, such that by the end of the Vedic period, the term rajanya was replaced by Kshatriya; where rajanya stresses kinship with the Rajan and Kshatriya denotes power over a specific domain. The term rajanya unlike the word Kshatriya essentially denoted the status within a lineage. Whereas Kshatra, means "ruling; one of the ruling order". Jaiswal points out the term Brahman rarely occurs in the Rigveda with the exception of the Purusha Sukta and may not have been used for the priestly class. Based on the authority of Pāṇini, Patanjali, Kātyāyana and the Mahabharata, Jayaswal believes that Rajanya was the name of political people and that the Rajanyas were, therefore, a democracy (with an elected ruler). Some examples were the Andhaka and Vrsni Rajanyas who followed the system of elected rulers. Ram Sharan Sharma details how the central chief was elected by various clan chiefs or lineage chiefs with increasing polarisation between the rajanya (aristocracy helping the ruler) and the vis (peasants) leading to a distinction between the chiefs as a separate class (raja, rajanya, kshatra, kshatriya) on one hand and vis (clan peasantry) on the other hand.

The term kshatriya comes from kshatra and implies temporal authority and power which was based less on being a successful leader in battle and more on the tangible power of laying claim to sovereignty over a territory, and symbolising ownership over clan lands. This later gave rise to the idea of kingship.

In the period of the Brahmanas (800 BCE to 700 BCE) there was ambiguity in the position of the varna. In the Panchavimsha Brahmana (13,4,7), the Rajanya are placed first, followed by Brahmana then Vaishya. In Shatapatha Brahmana 13.8.3.11, the Rajanya are placed second. In Shatapatha Brahmana 1.1.4.12 the order is—Brahmana, Vaishya, Rajanya, Shudra. The order of the Brahmanical tradition—Brahmana, Kshatriya, Vaishya, Shudra—became fixed from the time of dharmasutras (450 BCE to 100 BCE). The kshatriya were often considered pre-eminent in Buddhist circles. Even among Hindu societies they were sometimes at rivalry with the Brahmins, but they generally acknowledged the superiority of the priestly class. The Kshatriyas also began to question the yajnas of the historical Vedic religion, which led to religious ideas developed in the Upanishads.

=== Hindu ritual duties ===
The Kshatriyas studied Vedas, gave gifts and performed fire sacrifice.

Vedic duties of twice-born Varnas
| | Adhyayan (Study Vedas) | Yajana (performing sacrifice for one's own benefit) | Dana (Giving Gifts) | Adhyapana (Teaching Vedas) | Yaajana (Acting as Priest for sacrifice) | Pratigraha (accepting gifts) |
|---|---|---|---|---|---|---|
| Brahmin | ✓ | ✓ | ✓ | ✓ | ✓ | ✓ |
| Kshatriya | ✓ | ✓ | ✓ | No | No | No |
| Vaishya | ✓ | ✓ | ✓ | No | No | No |

=== Mahajanapadas ===
The gaṇa sangha form of government was an oligarchic republic during the period of the Mahajanapadas (c. 600–300 BCE), that was ruled by Kshatriya clans. However, these kshatriyas did not follow the Vedic religion, and were sometimes called degenerate Kshatriyas or Shudras by Brahmanical sources. The kshatriyas served as representatives in the assembly at the capital, debated various issues put before the assembly. Due to the lack of patronage of Vedic Brahmanism, the kshatriyas of the gana sanghas were often patrons of Buddhism and Jainism. In the Pali canon, Kshatriya is referred as khattiya.

In the kingdoms of the Mahajanapadas, the king claimed kshatriya status through the Vedic religion. While kings claimed to be kshatriya, some kings came from non-kshatriya origins.

After the Mahajanapada period, most of the prominent royal dynasties in northern India were not kshatriyas. The Nanda Empire, whose rulers were stated to be shudras, destroyed many kshatriya lineages.

=== Post-Mauryan Kshatriyas ===
After the collapse of the Maurya Empire, numerous clan-based polities in Punjab, Haryana, and Rajasthan claimed kshatriya status.

The Shakas and Yavanas were considered to be low-status kshatriyas by Brahmin authors.

In the third to fourth centuries CE, kingdoms in the Krishna and Godavari rivers claimed kshatriya status and performed Vedic rituals to legitimate themselves as rulers. During his visit to India in the 7th century, Hieun Tsang noted that kshatriya rulers were ruling the kingdoms like Kabul, Kosala, Bhillamala, Maharashtra and Vallabhi.

=== Emergence of "Puranic" Kshatriyas ===
In the era from 300 to 700 CE, new royal dynasties were bestowed kshatriya status by Brahmins by linking them to the kshatriyas of the epics and Puranas. Dynasties began affiliating themselves with the Solar and Lunar dynasties and this gave them legitimation as rulers. In return the newly christened kshatriyas would patronize and reward the Brahmins. The Sanskritic culture of the kshatriyas of this period was heavily influential for later periods and set the style that kshatriyas of later periods appealed to. This process took place both in North India and the Deccan.

=== Modern era ===
Writing in the context of how the jajmani system operated in the 1960s, Pauline Kolenda noted that the "caste function of the Kshatriya is to lead and protect the village, and with conquest to manage their conquered lands. The Kshatriyas do perform these functions today to the extent possible, by distributing food as payments to kamins and providing leadership."

== Symbols ==
In rituals, the nyagrodha (Ficus indica or India fig or banyan tree) danda, or staff, is assigned to the kshatriya class, along with a mantra, intended to impart physical vitality or 'ojas'.

== Lineage ==
The Vedas do not mention kshatriya (or varna) of any vamsha (lineage). The lineages of the Itihasa-Purana tradition are: the Solar dynasty (Suryavamsha); and the Lunar dynasty (Chandravamsha/Somavamsha).

There are other lineages, such as Agnivanshi ("fire lineage"), in which an eponymous ancestor is claimed from Agni (fire), and Nagavanshi (snake-born), claiming descent from the Nāgas, whose description can be found in scriptures such as Mahabharata.

== See also ==
- Indian caste system
- Forward castes
- Sanskritisation
