= Bara Balutedar =

Hereditary trades system in Maharashtra, India

The Bara Balutedar (English: Twelve Balutedar) system was a hereditary system of twelve trades used historically in villages of regions that is now the Indian state of Maharashtra. The balutedars used get paid for the services provided with village produce under a complex barter system. The system had similarities to the jajmani system prevalent in North India during the same period. Under the former system, the castes in the village worked for the landlord (Jajman) or the biggest landholding family in the village whereas with the latter system, the castes worked for the village.

== Classification and functions ==
The balutedar system was supported by the village agriculture. Occupational communities under this system provided services to the farmers and the economic system of the village. The base of this system was caste. The communities were responsible for tasks specific to their castes. There were different kinds of services under Bara Balutedar which could number more than twelve

- Joshi (Brahmin astrologer)
- Gurav (priest and temple maintenance),
- Nhavi (barbers)
- Parit (washers)
- Kumbhar (potters)
- Sutar (carpenters)
- Lohar (blacksmiths)
- Teli (oil pressers)
- Chambhar (cobblers leather craft and product)
- Koli (Fishing, agriculturist and water transport), The Kolis were found in about one-third of the villages. The provided water to the travellers, and at the rivers, made rafts and boats and were agriculturist. The rent-free land holdings of the Kolis were very considerable, being 16,307 bighas in Khandesh.
- Mang (manufacturing of organic fiber, making rope and article, making organic broom, security of people call as raakhanyaa)
- Mahar (village security, messengers, catching criminals, land arbitrators, and removal of animal carcasses
- Chaugula (assistant to Patil)

Under the baluta system, the balutedars had certain rights and privileges at ceremonies. Their services were remunerated by the cultivators in the form of an annual payment in sheaves of corn and a few seers of other grain grown in the field, such as wheat, hulga, gram, tur, groundnut, and others. For special services rendered on ceremonial occasions, payments were made in cash, grain or clothes. Sometimes food was given.

The barber, as a balutedar, would perform many duties not connected with his profession. At the time of a marriage ceremony, when the bridegroom went to the temple to pray, he held his horse and received a turban as a present. At village festivals or marriage ceremonies he sometimes acted as a cook, and also served food and water to the guests at such ceremonies. It was his privilege to act as a messenger at marriage ceremonies and call the invitees for the function. He gave massages to distinguished people of the village. He played the pipe and tambour at weddings and on other festive occasions.

The water-carrier not only supplied water to the villages but also kept watch during floods in the case of villages situated on river banks. He was also useful to the villagers to take them across the river with the help of a sangad (floats joined together. In this list of Balutedar: Dhor, Mang, Mahar, and Chambhar belonged to the untouchable group of castes. In exchange for their services, the balutedars were granted hereditary rights (watan) to a share in the village harvest. The system was formally abolished by statute in 1958.

== See also ==
- Jajmani system
