= Outline of entertainment =

Overview of and topical guide to entertainment

The following outline provides an overview of and topical guide to entertainment and the entertainment industry:

Entertainment is any activity which provides a diversion or permits people to amuse themselves in their leisure time, and may also provide fun, enjoyment, and laughter. People may create their own entertainment, such as when they spontaneously invent a game; participate actively in an activity they find entertaining, such as when they play sport as a hobby; or consume an entertainment product passively, such as when they attend a performance.

The entertainment industry (informally known as show business or show biz) is part of the tertiary sector of the economy encompassing a variety of businesses and sub-industries which create, distribute, and profit from a form of entertainment. The term show biz in particular connotes the commercially popular performing arts, especially theatre, dance, and music, as well as other forms of live entertainment. The global media and entertainment (M&E) market sector includes film, television, radio, mass media, video games, and more.

== Types of entertainment ==
=== Exhibition entertainment ===
- Amusement parks
- Art exhibits
- Fairs
- Festivals
- Museums
- Trade shows
- Traveling carnivals
- Travelling exhibition
- Vivariums
  - Aquariums
- Water parks
- Wax museums
- Zoos

=== Live entertainment ===
- Air shows
- Awards ceremony
- Banquet
- Burlesque
  - American burlesque
  - Neo-Burlesque
  - Victorian burlesque
- Cabaret
- Circus
  - Contemporary circus
- Comedy clubs
- Concerts
  - Concert residencies
  - Concert tours
- Ceremony
- Dance
- Discotheques
- Drag shows
- Drama
- Escape Rooms
- Fireworks
- Fashion shows
- Ice shows
- Improvisational theatre
- Magic
- Minstrel shows
- Music festivals
- Music hall
- Musical theatre
- Nightclubs
- Operas
- Parades
- Parties
- Performance art
- Performing arts
  - Marching arts
    - Color guard
    - Drum and bugle corps
    - Indoor percussion ensemble
    - Marching band
    - Pep band
    - Winter guard
- Professional wrestling / Sports entertainment
- Puppet shows
- Raves
- Revues
- Sideshows
- Spectator sports
- Stand-up comedy
- Street theatre
- Strip clubs
- Symphonies
- Theatre
- Variety show
- Vaudeville
- Ventriloquism
- Video art
- Wild West shows

=== Mass media entertainment industry ===
- Live entertainment
  - Musical theatre
  - Plays
  - Performance art
  - Comedy
  - Drama
  - Sports
- Film
  - Film studios
  - Movie theaters / cinemas
  - Film score
  - Film production
  - Acting
  - Pornography
- Broadcasting
  - Television
  - Television studio
    - Television programs
      - Reality television
  - Radio
    - Radio programs
    - Podcast
- Animation
  - Animation studio
- Music industry
  - Recording studio
  - Composers and songwriters
  - Singers and musicians
  - Choirs
  - Orchestras
  - Concert bands
  - Karaokes
  - Concert hall
- Mass media
- News media
  - Web television
  - News articles
- Fashion industry
  - Photographic studio
  - Modeling
- Literature

==== Digital Entertainment Industry ====
- Social media
  - Online video platform
- Digital music

==== Electronic entertainment ====
- SMS content
- Video game industry
  - Video games
- Toys

=== Other types of Media ===
- 24-hour news cycle
- Advertising media
- Alternative media
- Digital media
- Electronic media
- Hypermedia
- Independent media
- Interactive media
- List of art media
- Lost media
- Mass media
- Mainstream media
- Media
- Mobile media
- Multimedia
- New media
- News broadcasting
- News media
- Old media
- Physical media
- Publishing media
- Social media
  - Influencers
- State media
- Streaming media

== History of entertainment ==
=== Entertainment by historical period ===
- Entertainment in the 16th century
- Entertainment during the Great Depression

=== History by entertainment type ===
==== History of exhibition entertainment ====
- History of amusement parks
- History of fairs
- History of museums
- History of theme parks
- History of wax museums

==== History of live entertainment ====
- History of busking
- History of the circus
- History of comedy
- History of dance
- History of fireworks
- History of musical theatre
- History of nightclubs
- History of discotheques
- History of opera
- History of performance art
- History of plays
- History of magic
- History of sports
- History of striptease
- History of lap dancing
- History of theatre
- History of variety shows
- History of vaudeville

==== History of mass media entertainment ====
- History of animation
- History of architecture
- History of books
- History of erotic depictions
- History of film
- History of literature
- History of magazines
- History of the music industry
- History of new media
- History of painting
- History of photography
- History of radio
- History of sound recording
- History of television
- History of video games

== Entertainment law ==
- Entertainment law
  - Copyright Term Extension Act

== General concepts ==
- Acrobatics
- Aerial acts
- Animal training
- Applause
- Beauty pageant
- Celebrity
- Chinese yo-yo
- Circus
- Circus skills
- Clown
- Comedian
- Comedy
- Contact juggling
- Contemporary circus
- Contortion
- Corde lisse
- Cyr wheel
- Devil sticks
- Diabolo
- Equilibristics
- Fire breathing
- Fire eating
- Geisha
- German wheel
- Hand-to-hand balancing
- Hula hoop
- Human cannonball
- Humor
- Horse riding
- Internet humor
- Ice skating
- Impalement arts
- Juggling
- Knife throwing
- List of beauty contests
- List of persons who have won Academy, Emmy, Grammy, and Tony Awards
- Magic
- Mime
- New media
- Old time radio
- Performing arts
- Plate spinning
- Radio
- Radio programming
- Rock opera
- Rodeo clown
- Roller skating
- Sex industry
- Show business
- Showstopper
- Sideshow
- Spanish web
- Stiltwalking
- Sword swallowing
- Show jumping
- Teen idol
- Tightrope walking
- Trapeze
- Unicycle
- Ventriloquism

== Notable entertainers ==
- List of circuses and circus owners
- List of clowns
- List of comedians
- List of film and television directors
- List of film score composers
- List of magicians
- List of professional wrestlers
- List of theatre directors
- Lists of actors
- Lists of entertainers
- Lists of musicians
- Lists of sportspeople
- List of entertainment industry dynasties

== See also ==
- Drama
- Performance
- Television
- Theatre
- Outline of books
- Outline of culture
- Outlines of culture and arts
- Outline of communication
- Outline of dance
- Outline of film
- Outline of human sexuality
- Outline of the Internet
- Outline of literature
- Outline of music
- Outline of performing arts
- Outline of radio
- Outline of sports
- Outline of telecommunication
- Outline of television broadcasting
- Outline of theatre
- Outline of video games
- Media of New York City
- List of movie-related topics
- Gambling
- Cinema of the United States
