= Outline of theatre =

Overview of and topical guide to theatre

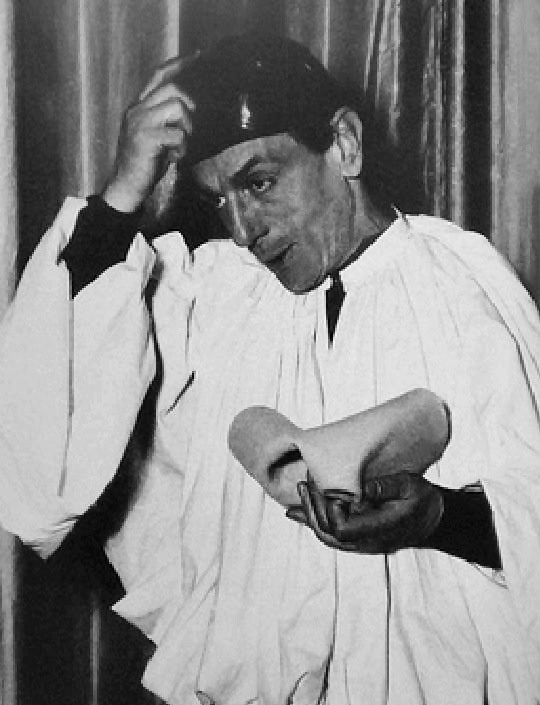
Eduardo De Filippo as Pulcinella, a character from the Italian Commedia dell'arte

The following outline is provided as an overview of and topical guide to theatre:

Theatre – the generic term for the performing arts and a usually collaborative form of fine art involving live performers to present the experience of a real or imagined event (such as a story) through acting, singing, and/or dancing before a live audience in a specific place. The performers may communicate this experience to the audience through combinations of speech, gesture, mime, puppets, music, dance, sound and spectacle — indeed any one or more elements of the other performing arts. Elements of design and stagecraft are used to enhance the physicality, presence and immediacy of the experience.

== Nature of theatre ==
Theatre may be described as all of the following:

- One of the arts
  - One of the performing arts
- Source of literature, in the form of plays, operas, dances, literary adaptations as presented in front of a live audience.
- Not necessarily high art: "The theater in any time is not exclusively made up of high art," wrote Brooks McNamara, "but of a complex of related forms: popular and amateur entertainment, and, in the 20th century, to a great extent, radio, television, motion pictures and the Internet."

== History of theatre ==
History of theatre includes:

=== Western tradition ===
Chronological movements of the Western tradition include:

- Theatre of ancient Greece – a theatrical culture that flourished in ancient Greece between c. 550 and c. 220 BC. Tragedy (late 6th century BC), comedy (486 BC), and the satyr play were the three dramatic genres to emerge there. Western theatre originated in Athens and its drama has had a significant and sustained impact on Western culture as a whole.
- Theatre of ancient Rome – diverse art form, ranging from festival performances of street theatre, nude dancing, and acrobatics, to the staging of Plautus's broadly appealing situation comedies, to the high-style, verbally elaborate tragedies of Seneca. Although Rome had a native tradition of performance, the Hellenization of Roman culture in the 3rd century BCE had a profound and energizing effect on Roman theatre and encouraged the development of Latin literature of the highest quality for the stage.
- Medieval theatre – theatre of Europe between the fall of the Western Roman Empire in the 5th century AD and the beginning of the Renaissance in approximately the 15th century AD. Medieval theatre covers all drama produced in Europe over that thousand-year period and refers to a variety of genres, including liturgical drama, mystery plays, morality plays, farces and masques.
- Commedia dell'arte – a form of Italian theatre characterized by masked "types" which was popular throughout Europe between the 16th and 18th centuries, and was responsible for the advent of the actress and improvised performances based on sketches or scenarios. A special characteristic of commedia is the lazzo, a joke or "something foolish or witty", usually well known to the performers and to some extent a scripted routine. Another characteristic of commedia is pantomime.
- English Renaissance theatre – also known as early modern English theatre, refers to the theatre of England, largely based in London, which occurred between the Reformation and the closure of the theatres in 1642. It includes the drama of William Shakespeare, Christopher Marlowe and many other famous playwrights.
- Restoration comedy – English comedies written and performed in the Restoration period from 1660 to 1710. After public stage performances had been banned for 18 years by the Puritan regime, the re-opening of the theatres in 1660 signalled a renaissance of English drama. Restoration comedy is notorious for its sexual explicitness.
- Restoration spectacular – elaborately staged productions beginning the late 17th-century Restoration period, enthralling audiences with action, music, dance, moveable scenery, baroque illusionistic painting, gorgeous costumes, and special effects such as trapdoor tricks, "flying" actors, and fireworks.
- Neoclassical theatre – theatrical movement that drew inspiration from the "classical" art and culture of Ancient Greece or Ancient Rome that was dominant in Europe from the mid-18th to the 19th centuries.
- Nineteenth-century theatre – wide range of movements in the theatrical culture of Europe and the United States in the 19th century. In the West, they include Romanticism, melodrama, the well-made plays of Scribe and Sardou, the farces of Feydeau, the problem plays of Naturalism and Realism, Wagner's operatic Gesamtkunstwerk, Gilbert and Sullivan's plays and operas, Wilde's drawing-room comedies, Symbolism, and proto-Expressionism in the late works of August Strindberg and Henrik Ibsen.
  - Nineteenth-century theatrical scenery
- Twentieth-century theatre – wide range of movements in the theatrical culture of the 20th century, including Naturalism, Realism, Expressionism and Experimental theatre.
  - Theatre of the United Kingdom – introduced by the Romans and part of the British culture since at least 1585.
    - West End – popular term for mainstream professional theatre staged in the large theatres of London's 'Theatreland', the West End.
    - London fringe – small scale theatres, many of them located above pubs, and the equivalent to New York's Off-Broadway or Off-Off-Broadway theatres.
    - Fringe festival – unjuried festivals, such as the Edinburgh Festival Fringe and Adelaide Fringe, permit artists to produce a wide variety of works.
  - Theater of the United States – based in the Western tradition.
    - Broadway – refers to theatrical performances presented in the Theater District centered along Broadway, and in Lincoln Center, in Manhattan in New York City. Along with London's West End theatre, Broadway theatre is widely considered to represent the highest level of commercial theatre in the English-speaking world.
    - Off-Broadway – professional venue in New York City with a seating capacity between 100 and 499, and for a specific production of a play, musical or revue. These theatres are smaller than Broadway theatres.
    - Off-Off-Broadway – theaters in New York City that have fewer than 100 seats, though the term can be used for any show in the New York City area that has neither an Off-Broadway nor a Broadway contract.
      - Downtown Theater – Part of the avant-garde artistic movement that began in the 1970s and is centered below 14th Street in Manhattan.
    - Regional theatre – professional theatre companies outside of New York City that produce their own seasons.
    - Summer stock theatre – any theatre that presents stage productions only in the summer within the United States. Often viewed as a starting point for professional actors, stock casts are typically young, just out of high school or still in college.
  - Theatre of the Soviet Union
    - Proletcult Theatre – theatrical branch of the Soviet cultural movement Proletcult concerned with the powerful expression of ideological content as political propaganda in the years following the revolution of 1917. Platon Kerzhentsev was one of its principal practitioners.

=== African ===
African theatre includes:

- Ancient Egyptian quasi-theatrical events – earliest recorded quasi-theatrical event dates back to 2000 BCE with the "passion plays" of Ancient Egypt. This story of the god Osiris was performed annually at festivals throughout the civilization.
- Yoruba theatre – origins are traced back to the masquerade of the Egungun (the "cult of the ancestor"). The traditional ceremony culminates in the essence of the masquerade where it is deemed that ancestors return to the world of the living to visit their descendants. In addition to its origin in ritual, Yoruba theatre can be "traced to the 'theatrogenic' nature of a number of the deities in the Yoruba pantheon, such as Obatala the arch divinity, Ogun the divinity of creativeness and Sango the divinity of the storm", whose reverence is imbued "with drama and theatre and the symbolic overall relevance in terms of its relative interpretation."

=== Asian ===
Asian theatre includes:

- Theatre of India – began with Sanskrit theatre and flourished between the 1st and 10th centuries CE, which was a period of relative peace in the history of India during which hundreds of plays were written. Modern Indian theatre developed during the period of colonial rule under the British Empire, from the mid-19th century until the mid-20th.
  - Temple dance – religious performance held in the temples, such as sadir, prescribed by Agamas (scriptures that codified temple rituals, etc.). Traces of these ancient temple dances of India are seen in Bharatanatyam and Odissi.
- Theatre of China – began as early as the Shang dynasty and often involved happiness, mimes, and acrobatic displays. Today it is often called Chinese opera, although this normally refers specifically to the more well-known forms such as Peking opera and Cantonese opera; there have been many other forms of theatre in China.
- Thai theatre – a tradition from the Middle Ages to stage plays based on plots drawn from Indian epics. In particular, the theatrical version of Thailand's national epic Ramakien, a version of the Indian Ramayana, remains popular in Thailand even today.
- Khmer and Malay theatre – In Cambodia, at the ancient capital Angkor Wat, stories from the Indian epics Ramayana and Mahabharata have been carved on the walls of temples and palaces. Similar reliefs are found at Borobudur in Indonesia.
- Theatre of Japan – traditional Japanese theater forms that are famous around the world, including Noh, kyōgen, kabuki, and bunraku (puppet theatre).

=== Middle Eastern ===
- Middle-Eastern theatre – the most popular forms of theatre in the medieval Islamic world were puppet theatre (which included hand puppets, shadow plays and marionette productions) and live passion plays known as ta'ziyehs, in which actors re-enact episodes from Muslim history. In particular, Shia Islamic plays revolved around the shaheed (martyrdom) of Ali's sons Hasan ibn Ali and Husayn ibn Ali. Secular plays known as akhraja were recorded in medieval adab literature, though they were less common than puppetry and ta'ziya theatre.

== Types of theatrical productions ==
- Amateur theatre – theatre performed by amateur actors and singers.
- Broadway theatre – theatrical performances presented in the 41 professional theatres each with 500 or more seats located in the Theater District and Lincoln Center along Broadway, in Midtown Manhattan, New York City.
- Community theatre – theatrical performance made for a community that may be performed by community members, professionals, or a collaboration between the two.
- Dinner theater – combines a restaurant meal with a staged play or musical.
- Fringe theatre – theatre that is experimental in style or subject matter.
- Happening – performances that are often multimedia, site-specific, and involve visual arts.
- Immersive theater – performances that remove the stage and immerse the audiences within the performance itself.
- Interactive theatre – a presentational or theatrical form or work that breaks the "fourth wall" that traditionally separates the performer from the audience both physically and verbally.
- Musical – a form of theatre combining songs, spoken dialogue, acting, and dance.
- Off-Broadway – theatrical performances that take place in theatres in Manhattan in New York City with a seating capacity between 100 and 499.
- Off-Off-Broadway – theatrical productions in New York City that began as part of an anti-commercial and experimental or avant-garde movement of drama and theatre. Off-Off-Broadway theatres are smaller than Broadway and Off-Broadway theatres, and usually have fewer than 100 seats.
- Off West End – theatrical performances in London that take place in theatres which are not included as West End theatres and usually have seating capacities of around 40 to 400.
- Opera – an art form in which singers and musicians perform a dramatic work combining text (called a libretto) and musical score, usually in a theatrical setting.
- Operetta – a genre of light opera, light in terms both of music and subject matter. It is also closely related, in English-language works, to forms of musical theatre.
- Play – theatrical performance with scripted dialogue between characters.
- Regional theatre – theatrical performances by a professional or semi-professional theatre company that produces its own seasons. The term regional theatre most often refers to a professional theatre outside New York City.
- Repertory theatre – Western theatre and opera production in which a resident company presents works from a specified repertoire, usually in alternation or rotation.
- Revue – multi-act popular theatrical entertainment that combines music, dance and sketches. The revue has its roots in 19th century American popular entertainment and melodrama but grew into a substantial cultural presence of its own during its golden years from 1916 to 1932.
- Site-specific theatre – any type of theatrical production designed to be performed at a unique, specially adapted location other than a standard theatre.
- Street theatre – form of theatrical performance and presentation in outdoor public spaces without a specific paying audience.
- Summer stock theatre – theatres that present stage productions only in the summer.
- Touring theatre – independent theatre that travels, presented at a different location in each city.
- Variety show – a combination of acts, especially musical performances and sketch comedy, and normally introduced by a compère (master of ceremonies) or host. Other types of acts include magic, animal and circus acts, acrobatics, juggling and ventriloquism.
- Vaudeville – a theatrical genre of variety entertainment that was popular in the United States and Canada from the early 1880s until the early 1930s. Each performance was made up of a series of separate, unrelated acts grouped together on a common bill. Types of acts included popular and classical musicians, dancers, comedians, trained animals, magicians, female and male impersonators, acrobats, illustrated songs, jugglers, one-act plays or scenes from plays, athletes, lecturing celebrities, minstrels, and movies.
- West End theatre – professional theatre staged in the large theatres of "Theatreland" in and near the West End of London.
- Workshop production – a form of theatrical performance, in which a play or musical is staged in a modest form which does not include some aspects of a full production.

== Genres of theatre ==
There are a variety of genres that writers, producers and directors can employ in theatre to suit a variety of tastes:

- Closet drama – a play written primarily to be read by a solitary reader rather than performed on stage.
- Comedy – any humorous discourse or work generally intended to amuse by creating laughter.
  - Black comedy – a comic work that employs "black humor" or gallows humor.
  - Commedia dell'arte – a form of theatre characterized by masked "types" which began in Italy in the 16th century, and was responsible for the advent of the actress and improvised performances based on sketches or scenarios.
  - Comedy of errors – a work that is light and often humorous or satirical in tone, in which the action usually features a series of comic instances of mistaken identity, and which typically culminates in a happy resolution of the thematic conflict.
  - Comedy of manners – satirizes the manners and affectations of a social class, often represented by stock characters.
  - Comedy of situation – features characters sharing the same common environment, such as a home or workplace, accompanied with jokes as part of the dialogue.
  - Farce – aims at entertaining the audience by means of unlikely, extravagant, and improbable situations, disguise and mistaken identity, verbal humour of varying degrees of sophistication, which may include word play, and a fast-paced plot whose speed usually increases, culminating in an ending which often involves an elaborate chase scene.
  - Romantic comedy – light-hearted, humorous plotlines, centered on romantic ideals such as that true love is able to surmount most obstacles.
- Documentary theatre –
- Domestic drama – focuses on the realistic everyday lives of middle or lower classes in a certain society, generally referring to the post-Renaissance eras.
- Drama –
- Epic theatre –
- Experimental theatre –
- Fantasy –
- Gig theatre –
- Grand Guignol –
- Historical theatre –
- Improvisational theatre – often comedic, and sometimes poignant or dramatic productions where actors/improvisers use improvisational acting techniques to perform spontaneously.
- In-yer-face theatre – a term for drama that emerged in Great Britain in the 1990s to describe work by young playwrights who present vulgar, shocking, and confrontational material on stage as a means of involving and affecting their audiences.
- Mainstream theatre –
- Morality play –
- Musical theatre –
- Natya –
- Pantomime –
- Physical theatre – any mode of performance that pursues storytelling or drama through primarily and secondarily physical and mental means.
- Political theatre –
- Popular theatre –
- Postdramatic theatre – an experiential avant-garde style of theatre privileging performative aesthetic over drama and the written text.
- Puppetry –
- Radio drama –
- Reader's theatre – a style of theatre in which the actors do not memorize their lines. Rather, they either go through their blocking holding scripts and reading off their lines, or else sit/stand together on a stage and read through the script together.
- Rock opera –
- Site-specific theatre – a style that takes place outside of conventional professional theatre venues and uses references to the site for often unique (one-time) performances.
- Theatre for development – a type of community-based or interactive theatre practice that aims to promote civic dialogue and engagement.
- Theatre for Young Audiences
- Theatre of the Oppressed – a collection of theatrical forms developed by Augusto Boal in the 1970s which aim to create interactions between the audience and performers as a means of promoting social and political change.
- Theatre of the Absurd – a post–World War II genre of absurdist dramas written primarily by a number of European playwrights in the late 1950s, exploring the idea of what happens when human existence has no meaning and all communication breaks down.
- Tragedy – a style of theatre based on human suffering that evokes an accompanying catharsis.
- Tragicomedy –
- Vanguard-style theater –

== Styles of theatre ==
There are a variety of theatrical styles used in theatre and drama. These include:

- Absurdism – presents a perspective that all human attempts at significance are illogical. Ultimate truth is chaos with little certainty. There is no necessity that need drive us.
- Expressionism – anti-realistic in seeing appearance as distorted and the truth lying within man. The outward appearance on stage can be distorted and unrealistic to portray an eternal truth.
- Melodrama – sentimental drama with musical underscoring, often with an unlikely plot that concerns the suffering of the good at the hands of evildoers but ends happily with good triumphant. Featuring stock characters such as the noble hero, the long-suffering damsel in distress, and the cold-blooded villain.
- Modernism – a broad concept that sees art, including theatre, as detached from life in a pure way and able to reflect on life critically.
- Naturalism – life on stage is presented with close attention to detail, based on observations of "real life."
- Postmodern theatre – originated in Europe in the middle of the 20th century out of the postmodern philosophy as a reaction against modernist theatre. Postmodern theatre raises questions rather than attempting to supply answers or definitive truth.
- Puppetry– an ancient form where performers/puppeteers manipulate performing objects. Puppetry has many variations and forms.
- Realism – characters are portrayed as close to real life, with realistic settings and staging.

== Types of stages ==
- Opera house – theatre building used for opera performances that consists of a stage, an orchestra pit, audience seating, and backstage facilities for costumes and set building. While some venues are constructed specifically for operas, other opera houses are part of larger performing arts centers.
- Black box – usually used for student productions or presentations. A small, square space with minimum amount of lighting and sound equipment needed. Often painted black or another neutral color.
- Proscenium – The proscenium arch was the most common form of theatre building in the 18th, 19th and 20th centuries. The "arch" acts like a picture frame through which the action can be seen.
- Theatre in the round – a theatre in which the audience surrounds the stage.
- Thrust stage – a stage that has the audience sitting on three sides and is connected to the backstage area by its upstage end.

== Participants in theatre ==
- Actor –
- Stage manager –
- Technician –
- Prop Master/Mistress –
- Running crew –
- Front of house –
- Orchestra –
- Wardrobe Master/Mistress –
- Technical director –
- Dramaturgist –

== General theatre concepts ==
- Act – plays are separated into acts with the acts separated into scenes.
- Acting – the art of performing
- Cold reading – reading a script for the first time. Usually the designers have read and analyzed the text for design purposes before a cast has been selected. Sometimes a cold reading involves the entire cast, crew, and designers who are experiencing the script for the first time as an ensemble.
- Curtain call – taking a bow at the end of the performance. Actors will generally acknowledge the orchestra pit (if there were any musicians) and the running crew as well as the audience.
- Drama therapy – the use of theatre as therapy for a variety of issues.
- Everyman – the concept of the universal person that the audience can relate to.
- Footlights – originally lighting was placed at the front edge of the stage under hoods so as to not bother the audience. It can be a generic term for anyone wanting to be involved with theatre. A play of that name is now a musical and also a Theatrical Comedy Troupe at Cambridge University.
- Theatrical property – Props are the items actors pick up, use, move, etc. on stage. These can include consumables such as drinks, food, etc.
- Stage – The surface upon which the sets are built upon and the actors stand to tell the story. Can be raked (that is, at an angle).
- Stagecraft – usually refers to the design aspect of theatre. Examples: lights, sound, props, costumes, makeup, set.
- Theatrical constraints – budgets, time, allergies
- Theatrical scenery – also referred to as the set or the scenic elements. The physical representation of the world of the play.
- Theatrical superstitions – some theatre spaces have their own superstitions; there are universal ones that many theatre people adhere to.
- Ticket – this is the domain of the Front of House, as well as the programs, ushers, and seeing patrons (the audience) are seated before the lights are darkened at the beginning of the play, but also at intermission.
- Spectacle – what the audience experiences.
- Rehearsals – where the actors and the director (and sometimes assistant director) start to plan the movements, the tempo, timing, the energy level of all the scenes.
- Dress rehearsals – where all the components (costumes, lighting, set, props, actors) come together to run through the play from start to finish, not only to get issues such as set and costume changes finalized and timed correctly, but to smooth out any minor issues with lighting, sound, tempo, etc.
- Tech rehearsals – rehearsals where the actors are not involved. They give the sound, lighting, and running crew a chance to rehearse and create a rhythm that is proficient and smooth prior to dress rehearsals.
- Run-throughs – The meaning of this term depends on the director. Generally, it can mean just running through an act with the actors (no technical aspects involved). Sometimes it can involve costume changes, as those can become complicated if wig changes are also required. Costume changes can be rehearsed and done in as little as 30 seconds to 2 minutes (if a wig is involved).

== See also ==
- Antitheatricality
- Chronology of Shakespeare plays
- List of Canadian plays
- List of films based on stage plays or musicals
- List of plays made into feature films
- List of theaters for dance
- Outline of performing arts
  - Outline of film
  - Outline of opera
