= List of motion picture production equipment =

The film industry uses many tools and types of equipment during and after production:

== A ==
- A roll - Ambient light - Apple box - Artificial light

== B ==
- B roll - Baby plates - Backlot - Background lighting - Balloon light - Bar clamp adapter pin - Barn doors (lighting) - Basso block - Blimp

== C ==
- C-Stand - Callier effect - Cameo lighting - Camera boom - Camera crane - Camera dolly - Clap or 'Film Clap'

== D ==
- Diffuser (lighting) - Digital audio tape recorder - Digital film - Digital negative - Digital projection - Dimmer (lighting) - Dolly grip

== G ==
- Gobo (lighting) - Gimbal - Gyro-stabilized camera systems

== J ==
Jib (camera)

== M ==
MixPre
