= Khasi cinema =

Khasi-language film industry

Khasi Cinema is the term used to refer to the Khasi language film industry based in Shillong in Meghalaya, India.

== History ==
=== Pre-2000 ===
In 1981, Hamlet Bareh Ngapkynta's film Ka Synjuk Ri ki Laiphew Syiem became the first ever film to be made in Khasi language. In 1984, Ardhendu Bhattacharya's film Manik Raitong became the first ever colour film in Khasi language. The film industry later suffered due to militancy in the state of Meghalaya.

=== Post-2000 ===
After 2000s, when militancy in the state came down drastically, a market for entertainment and movies opened up. Many short films and telefilms began being produced in Khasi. The production of feature films in Khasi got a major fillip after entry of national award-winning filmmakers like Pradip Kurbah.
