= Economics in film =

Santiago Sánchez-Pagés, in The Representation of Economics in Cinema (2021), argues, drawing on Alfred Marshall's definition of economics, that economics is pervasive and therefore "everywhere in cinema", and he links filmmaking to economic modelling through "parallel, symbolic worlds" populated by agents with limited information and constraints shaped by laws, institutions, and social norms. Milica Zarkovic Bookman and Aleksandra S. Bookman, in Economics in Film and Fiction (2009), similarly write that people are consistently exposed to economic principles in films and books even when those principles are not what audiences remember.

== Background ==
=== Sanchez-Pages ===
Alfred Marshall defined economics as the study of "that part of individual and social action which is most closely connected with the attainment and with the use of the material requisites of well-being". In The Representation of Economics in Cinema, Santiago Sanchez-Pages quotes this definition and states that it "highlights the pervasiveness of economics in our lives", adding that economics is an "inescapable reality". Sanchez-Pages also writes, "Because economics is so pervasive in our lives, economics is everywhere in cinema too," and he cites early film examples: Workers Leaving the Lumière Factory (1895), which portrayed laborers leaving the Lumière factory, and D. W. Griffith's A Corner in Wheat (1909), in which a financier cornered the wheat market to control its price.

Sanchez-Pages states that filmmakers create "parallel, symbolic worlds" containing enough elements of reality to be "credible and plausible", and he compares this to "good economic models", which focus on an agent (such as a firm, voter, or consumer) to understand motivations and responses to environmental change. He adds that, like economic agents, film characters "do not have full information" and face constraints described as "laws, institutions, and social norms" that determine which behaviours are acceptable.

Sanchez-Pages describes the relationship between economics and film as bidirectional: the economic climate affects cinema’s content and topics, and cinema influences public opinion on economic issues and policy proposals. He reports that Thomas Piketty's book Capital in the Twenty-First Century (2013) sold 2.5 million copies worldwide, while the film The Big Short (2015) sold 8.2 million tickets in the United States, and he adds that film actors and actresses have been catalysts for campaigns with "far-reaching economic implications", citing Blood Diamond (2006) and Dark Waters (2019). Sanchez-Pages further states that many films about business, finance, or unemployment show a "dismissive attitude toward markets and economics as a discipline", and that staggered screenings of The Birth of a Nation (1915) were followed by results that "show" the film "induced" an increase in patriotism (measured by World War I recruiting rates) and strengthened segregation against African Americans in the labor market. He also writes that economists often dismiss filmmakers' contributions to economics, arguing that films "can conveniently illustrate truths economists already know".

=== Bookmans ===
In Economics in Film and Fiction, the authors write that many people read Charlotte's Web and watched The Wizard of Oz when they were young, but "chances are it's not the economics principles that they remember". They add, "People have consistently been exposed to economics principles in the movies they’ve watched and the books they’ve read." The authors also write, "These same people probably didn't read The Iliad and wonder about the production costs of building the Trojan Horse nor watch Legally Blonde and focus on the price of Elle's shoes."
