= Scenario (performing arts) =

Synoptical collage of an event or series of actions and events

In the performing arts, a scenario (/sɪˈnɑːri.oʊ/, US also /sɪˈnɛəri.oʊ, -ˈnær-/; Italian: [ʃeˈnaːrjo]; from Italian scenario, "that which is pinned to the scenery") is a synoptical collage of an event or series of actions and events. In the commedia dell'arte, it was an outline of entrances, exits, and action describing the plot of a play, and was literally pinned to the back of the scenery. It is also known as canovaccio or "that which is pinned to the canvas" of which the scenery was constructed.

Surviving scenarios from the Renaissance contain little other than character names, brief descriptions of action, and references to specific lazzi with no further explanation. It is believed that a scenario formed the basis for a fully improvisational performance, though it is also likely that they were simple reminders of the plot for those members of the cast who were literate. Modern commedia troupes most often make use of a script with varying degrees of additional improvisation.

In the creation of an opera or ballet, a scenario is often developed initially to indicate how the original source, if any, is to be adapted and to summarize the aspects of character, staging, plot, etc. that can be expanded later in a fully developed libretto, or script. This sketch can be helpful in "pitching" the idea to a prospective producer, director or composer.

In the filmmaking of the early 20th century, film scenarios (also called "treatments" or "synopses") were short written scripts to provide narrative coherence that had previously been improvised. They could consist of a simple list of scene headings or scene headings with a detailed explication of the action in each scene. At this time in the silent era, scripts had yet to include individual shots or dialogue. These scenario scripts evolved into lengthier continuity scripts, which listed a number of shots within each scene, thus providing continuity to streamline the filmmaking process.
