= Temple dance =

Religious performance held in Hindu temples

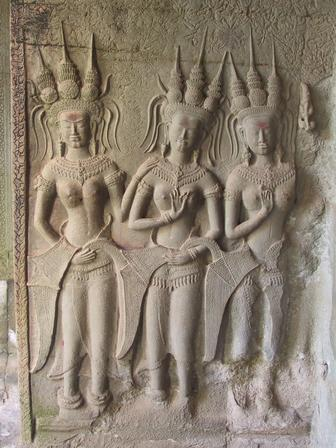
A bas relief at the 12th-century temple of Angkor Wat in Cambodia showing apsara temple dancers.

Temple dance denotes a religious performance held in the temples, such as sadir, prescribed by Agamas (scriptures that codified temple rituals, etc.). Traces of these ancient temple dances of India are seen in Bharatanatyam and Odissi.

The sacred Hindu temple dance used to be performed by devadasis and Mahari Dance, who were supposed to manifest in the material body the heavenly dance of apsaras.
