= List of animation studios owned by Warner Bros. Discovery =

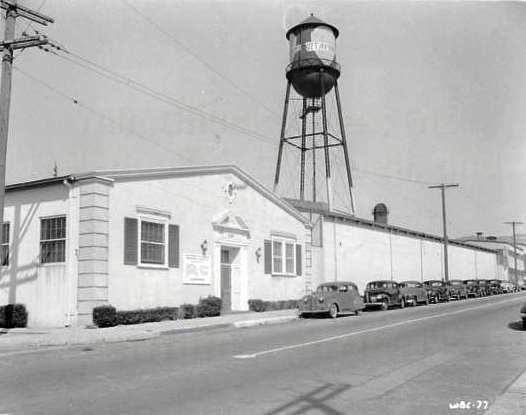
Warner Bros. Cartoons studio, part of the Old Warner Bros. Studio

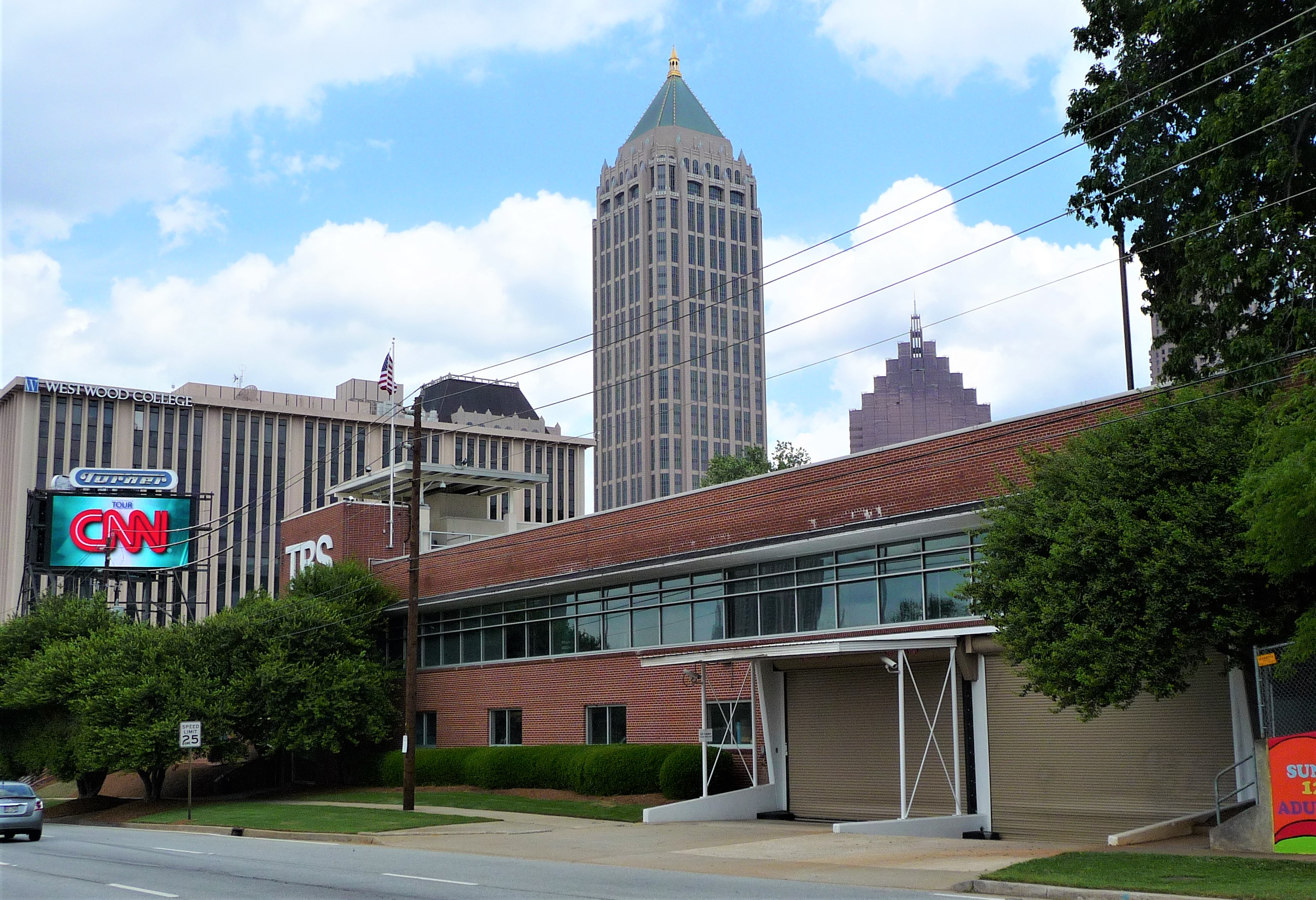
Outside of the Williams Street studio.

Warner Bros. Discovery has owned and operated several animation studios since its founding on February 10, 1972, as WarnerMedia, before merging with Discovery, Inc. on April 8, 2022, including its flagship feature animation studio Warner Bros. Animation through Warner Bros. Entertainment that claims heritage from this original studio.

Besides Warner Bros. Animation, Warner Bros. Discovery also presently operates Warner Bros. Pictures Animation, Cartoon Network Studios, Hanna-Barbera Studios Europe and Williams Street (through The Cartoon Network, Inc.). This article does not include other animation studios whose films were released by Warner Bros. Pictures.

== Full list ==
Current animation studios
Studio	Established	Parent unit
Warner Bros. Animation	1980	Warner Bros. Television Studios
Animation: Television & DVD films, short films, specials and television series in hand-drawn, digital, and CGI. Current animation division of Warner Bros. and successor of Warner Bros. Cartoons. Units: Warner Bros. Television Animation (1981–2003), Warner Bros. Feature Animation (1994–2004), Warner Bros. Animation VFX (2004–2018)
Warner Bros. Pictures Animation	2013	Warner Bros. Pictures
Animation: Theatrical feature films and short films Feature film animation division of Warner Bros. Former names: Warner Animation Group (2013–2023)
Cartoon Network Studios	1994	Warner Bros. Television Studios
Animation: Television series, specials and feature films Currently an animation division of Warner Bros (operated through Warner Bros. Discovery Networks, formerly Turner Broadcasting System) under The Cartoon Network, Inc. The studio produces original series and films for Cartoon Network. The studio also does some live-action programming for the channel. Satellite studios: CN LA Original Productions
Williams Street	1994	Warner Bros. Television Studios
Animation: Television series, specials and feature films Currently an animation division of Warner Bros (operated through Warner Bros. Discovery Networks, formerly Turner Broadcasting System) under The Cartoon Network, Inc. The studio produces live-action and animated series and films for Cartoon Network's programming block Adult Swim. Former names: Ghost Planet Industries (1994–1999) (Note: Original name for Williams Street, taking its name from the fictional planet from Space Ghost.); Units: Big Pixel Studios, Williams Street Records
Hanna-Barbera Studios Europe	2007	Warner Bros. Television Studios UK
Animation: Television series, specials, shorts and feature films Currently an animation division of Warner Bros (operated through Warner Bros. Discovery Networks, formerly Turner Broadcasting System) under The Cartoon Network, Inc. The studio produces series and shorts across Europe, such as The Amazing World of Gumball. Former names: Cartoon Network Development Studio Europe (2007–2019), Cartoon Network Studios Europe (2017–2021).

Divested or defunct animation studios
Studio	Established	Status
Warner Bros. Cartoons	1933	Defunct in 1969
Animation: Hand-drawn theatrical feature films and short films The original animation unit of Warner Bros. Originally founded as an independent studio called Harman-Ising Productions in 1926, then renamed to Leon Schlesinger Productions in 1933, it was later sold to WB in 1944. After its closure in 1963, it was briefly reopened in 1967, only to be shut down for good in 1969. Former names: Leon Schlesinger Productions (1933–1944)
Hanna-Barbera	1957	Defunct in 2001
Animation: Theatrical films, direct to video films, short films and television films, television series The animation studio of Tom and Jerry creators William Hanna and Joseph Barbera, best known for various television series like The Flintstones, Yogi Bear and Scooby-Doo. Closed in 2001 and absorbed into Warner Bros Animation. Currently exists as an in-name only entity, used for later series and films based on its properties.
Ruby-Spears	1977	Defunct in 1996
Animation: Television series and specials The animation studio of creators Joe Ruby and Ken Spears, best known for various television series like Alvin and the Chipmunks, Centurions, Mister T and Rubik, the Amazing Cube. Closed in 1996 and absorbed into Warner Bros Animation. Currently exists as an in-name only entity, used for later series and films based on its properties.
Warner Bros. Feature Animation	1994	Defunct in 2004
Animation: Feature films The theatrical feature film unit of Warner Bros. Animation. Closed in 2004 after the financial failure of Looney Tunes: Back in Action.
Rooster Teeth Animation	2003	Defunct in 2024
Animation: Web series, feature films Former animation division of Rooster Teeth. The studio was closed alongside its parent company in May 2024.
Turner Feature Animation	1991	Defunct in 1997
Animation: Feature films Spun off from the Hanna-Barbera feature animation division in 1991, the studio was later folded into Warner Bros. Feature Animation in 1997.

== Warner Bros. Motion Picture Group ==
=== Warner Bros. Feature Animation ===
Warner Bros. Feature Animation, a division of Warner Bros. Motion Picture Group, opened in 1994 with 360 employees in Burbank, and another 100 employees in London. Warner Bros. placed veteran film producer Max Howard in charge of the new division.

==== Projects ====
Release date	Title	Notes
November 15, 1996	Space Jam	
March 26, 1997	Cats Don't Dance	
May 15, 1998	Quest for Camelot	
August 6, 1999	The Iron Giant	
August 10, 2001	Osmosis Jones	
November 14, 2003	Looney Tunes: Back in Action	

=== Warner Bros. Pictures Animation ===
Warner Bros. Pictures Animation (formerly known as the Warner Animation Group) was created in 2013, by Jeff Robinov to create animated theatrical films for Warner Bros. Pictures, and to replace the shuttered Warner Bros. Feature Animation which closed in 2004.

==== Projects ====
Release date	Title	Notes
February 7, 2014	The Lego Movie	
June 17, 2014	Enter the Ninjago	Included with the home media release of The Lego Movie.
January 29, 2016	The Lego Movie: 4D – A New Adventure	An attraction at Legoland Florida
September 23, 2016	The Master	Short which premiered before the theatrical release of Storks
September 23, 2016	Storks	
February 10, 2017	The Lego Batman Movie	
September 22, 2017	The Lego Ninjago Movie	
September 28, 2018	Smallfoot	
February 8, 2019	The Lego Movie 2: The Second Part	
May 15, 2020	Scoob!	
February 26, 2021	Tom & Jerry	
July 16, 2021	Space Jam: A New Legacy	
July 29, 2022	DC League of Super-Pets	

== Warner Bros. Television Group ==
=== Warner Bros. Cartoons ===
Established in 1933, after Harman and Ising who had been creating animated shorts for Warner Bros. since 1927, left for Metro-Goldwyn-Mayer. Warner Bros. Cartoons began creating animated shorts for the company, going on to launch the most famous characters in history, Bugs Bunny, Porky Pig and Daffy Duck for the Looney Tunes and Merrie Melodies series. The animation studio created dozens of award-winning shorts before shuttering in 1969.

=== Cartoon Network Studios ===
Founded in 1994, Cartoon Network Studios originated as a division of Hanna-Barbera, that focused on producing original programing for Cartoon Network including Dexter's Laboratory, Johnny Bravo, and The Powerpuff Girls. Following the merger of Hanna-Barbera's parent, Turner Broadcasting System with Time Warner, the Hanna-Barbera studio was folded into Warner Bros. Animation by its chief executive, Jean MacCurdy. After Hanna-Barbera merged into Warner Bros. Animation, Cartoon Network Studios was resurrected as a separate entity.

=== Williams Street ===
Created in 1994, Williams Street Productions was started by Cartoon Network to produce more adult-targeted serials for the network. Being the main production arm of Adult Swim, the division started as Ghost Planet Industries, named after the home planet of the titular character of their first production, Space Ghost Coast to Coast.

== Turner Entertainment Co. ==
=== Hanna-Barbera Cartoons ===
Started in 1957 by Tom and Jerry creators William Hanna and Joseph Barbera. The company went on to create numerous television shows. In 1991, the studio was acquired by Turner Broadcasting System, and began creating media exclusively for Cartoon Network. In 1998 it was moved to the same complex as Warner Bros. Animation, before the two companies were merged in 2001. Hanna-Barbera exists only as a copyright holder to their old properties.

=== Turner Feature Animation ===
Founded in 1994, Turner Feature Animation was created from the feature animation division of Hanna-Barbera. After its first film in 1994, the studio's parent company Turner Entertainment was bought by Time Warner in 1996, and the Turner Feature Animation division was folded into Warner Bros. Feature Animation before the release of their second and final film.
