= Badaga cinema =

Badaga-language film industry

Badaga Cinema is the term used to refer to the Badaga language film industry based in Udagamandalam in Tamil Nadu, India. Since the production of the first Badaga film in the mid-1970s, a total of four Badaga films have been made.

== Films ==
- Kaalaa Thaappita Payilu (1979)
- Hosa Mungaru (2006)

It is the first colour film in Baduga language. The film was directed by Vetri, and edited by King David. It was released in 2006.

- Gavava Thedi (2009)
- Cinnatha Boomi (2010)
- Olluna Atta (2019)
