= List of animation distribution companies =

This is a list of animation distribution companies.

== Active ==
- Bandai Visual
- Cake Entertainment
- Cartoon Network Productions
- Classic Media
- Crunchyroll
- GKIDS
- Harmony Gold USA
- Nest Family Entertainment
- Netflix Animation Studios
- Nihon Ad Systems
- Scholastic Entertainment
- Section23 Films
- Taffy Entertainment
- Viz Media
- World Events Productions

== Defunct ==
- 4Kids Entertainment
- BVS Entertainment
- Entertainment Rights
- Funimation Entertainment
- HIT Entertainment
- PorchLight Entertainment
- Warner Bros. Family Entertainment
- ZIV International

== See also ==
- List of animation studios
