= Jajmani system =

Indian caste-based labour system

The jajmani system or yajman system was an economic system most notably found in villages of the Indian subcontinent in which lower castes performed various functions for upper castes and received grain or other goods in return. It was an occupational division of labour involving a system of role-relationships that enabled villages to be mostly self-sufficient.

== Etymology ==
The word jajmani has its origins as a descriptor of those who paid for religious sacrifices in the Vedic period but today refers to a system of exchange of services. As a sociological model that became much studied from the late 1950s, it is at odds with the demiurgic model posited earlier by Max Weber and William H Wiser

== Definition ==
A village study by William Wiser published in 1936 was the first significant attempt to examine the relationships within the caste system of India from an economic perspective, although colonial administrators such as Baden Henry Powell had earlier noted the phenomenon. Oscar Lewis relied on Wiser's study for his 1958 definition of the jajmani system, saying that "Under this system each caste group within a village is expected to give certain standardized services to the families of other castes", while Harold Gould summarised Wiser's explanation of its main features as being that the economic services were "fixed in type, were rendered by one caste to another, and involved primarily and characteristically payments in kind although cash payments might also be made in some circumstances".

Whilst those providing services, such as barbers and carpenters, practised hereditary occupations, they did so not for all the occupants of a village but rather for a specific family or group of families and the relationship between the providers (kameen or kamin) and the receivers (jajman) persisted through the generations. As such, the system perpetuated a patron-client model rather than that of an employer-employee, with the service providers generally being unable to operate in an open market. Between themselves, the kameen traded to fulfill their needs on the basis of barter or some other system of equal-value exchange. The jajmani system enabled villages to be largely self-sufficient economic entities that operated statically for subsistence rather dynamically with the intention of growth and exchange of economic product elsewhere.

There was a spate of academic studies of the system around the late 1950s and early 1960s and it was still reported as existing in rural areas of India in the 1970s.

== Operation ==
Although the jajmani system has been identified as operating in much of modern India, it was neither entirely restricted to the post-colonial country nor present everywhere within it. For example, it was found in Sri Lanka and areas of Pakistan but seems never to have been used in the South Indian district of Malnad, nor in what is now Bangladesh.

The relationship between the system and Hindu notions of ritual pollution, whereby performance of certain tasks are considered in various degrees to be ritually impure, has been strongly emphasised by Gould but less so by other researchers. Characteristically, the system involved little monetary exchange, relying instead on the exchange of services for goods, most commonly grain and other food but also such things as housing, clothing, timber and sometimes a little land for use as sharecroppers. Along with barbers and carpenters, John Bodley notes potters, shoe-makers and sweepers as being typical examples of the artisanal occupational groups, but the system also incorporated Brahmin priests and other castes with religious functions.

Most significantly, the system applied to agricultural labourers because a primary function of the system was to ensure that the higher-caste, landowning people had a pool of landless menial labour to work their fields. It thus acted as a restrictor on the social, economic and geographic movement of the kameens. The kameens generally accepted the situation because they considered their ancestors to have garnered them sacred rights through their hereditary functions. They were guaranteed some sort of livelihood, however poor, and also a degree of welfare protection in times of need. Actual ability to perform the hereditary task, learned from their peers, was not necessarily a significant drawback because their role was their birthright.

Despite its apparent rigidity, the jajmani system adapted to some wider changes. For example, Gould reported in his 1960s study of an area of eastern Uttar Pradesh, North India, that the Kori caste, who were traditionally weavers, had become agricultural labourers, ploughmen, midwives, scavengers and sweepers because industrialisation had made their prior role redundant. Similarly, the Thakurs, who were traditionally warriors, were redundant, and he noted that in some cases occupations had been merged, an example being that the Badiga in an area of South India were by then both carpenters and blacksmiths. Another notable development was the influx of Muslim people into the system.

Thomas Beidelman has suggested that the rapid rise in the lower-caste population coupled with the division of lands held by the higher castes tipped a finely balanced, sometimes strained, but viable system of supply and demand into one that could not be sustained. The system had adapted to imbalances for many years by various redistributions but could not do so indefinitely. For example, some kameens had serviced jajmans beyond their own village, had changed their occupations or had adapted to provide a service when a village lacked any members from a caste for whom it was a traditional occupation. Kolenda notes that there were occasions when an entire caste group left a village to join relatives elsewhere, which suggests that the kameens were not entirely without power in the system. Developing cities provided a route out of the system entirely.

== Impact ==
Jajmani arrangements were an integral part of the caste system in rural India and thus contributed to criticism of the economic impact of that system since at least the 1960s. Critics say that it limited industrial development by restricting labour both in terms of geographic movement and transfer or adoption of new skillsets. By fixing roles, it also sustained the incapable or inefficient and prevented people who might have an aptitude for other things from pursuing alternative lines of work - Man Singh Das notes that "cheap help is not always good help". Furthermore, its relationship to the Hindu notion of ritual pollution meant that members of higher castes were extremely limited in their choices of occupation in an industrialised economy.

== See also ==
- Bara Balutedar
- Veth (India)
