= List of animation studios owned by NBCUniversal =

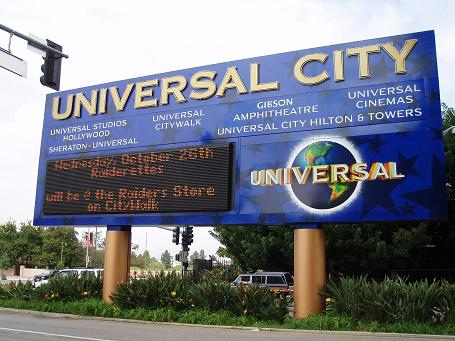
Universal City Plaza, in California, United States, the headquarters of Universal Pictures

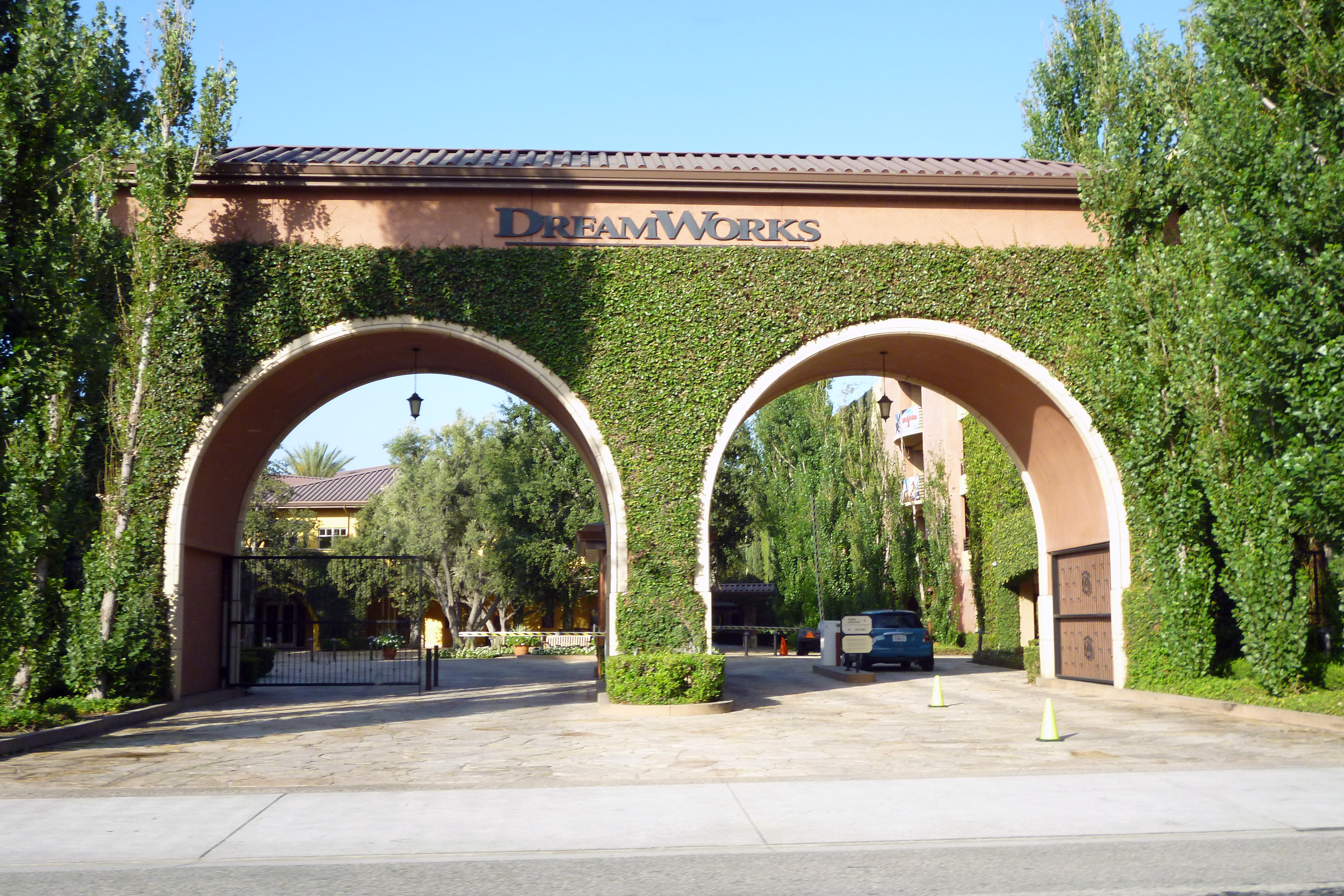
DreamWorks headquarters in Glendale, California, United States

NBCUniversal, a major media company owned by Comcast, has owned and operated several animation studios.

Its flagship feature animation studio, Universal Animation Studios through Universal 1440 Entertainment, a division of Universal Pictures Home Entertainment via Universal Pictures, outputs television, direct-to-video, and animated feature film releases. Currently, NBCUniversal also owns Illumination and DreamWorks Animation as part of the Universal Filmed Entertainment Group. This article does not include other independently owned animation studios whose films were only released by Universal Pictures.

== Full list ==
- Universal Animation Studios
- DreamWorks Animation Studios
- Illumination

=== Universal Filmed Entertainment Group ===
==== Universal Animation Studios ====
Founded in 1990, Universal Animation Studios (formally Universal Cartoon Studios) is the primary animation division of Universal 1440 Entertainment through Universal Pictures.

== Notes ==
Walter Lantz Studio - exclusive rights to film library and assets
