= Lazzi =

Stock comedic routines

Lazzi (/ˈlɑːtsi/; from the Italian lazzo, a joke or witticism) are stock comedic routines that are associated with commedia dell'arte. Performers, especially those playing the masked Arlecchino, had many examples of this in their repertoire, and would use improvisatory skills to weave them into the plot of dozens of different commedia scenarios. These largely physical sequences could be improvised or preplanned within the performance and were often used to enliven the audience when a scene was dragging, to cover a dropped line or cue, or to delight an expectant audience with the troupe's specialized lazzi.

Lazzi could be completed by a single player (e.g. the Lazzo of the School of Humanity wherein a Zanni character would announce that his sister was running a "school of humanity" from their home because she was a prostitute), a few individuals (e.g. the Lazzo of the Straw wherein a stock character of higher status would pour wine as his servant emptied it through a straw), or the entire troupe (e.g. the Lazzo of Nightfall wherein the entire troupe would stumble onto stage to enact hapless physical sequences as though the room was pitch black). While its placement in the plot was usually fixed during rehearsals, it was acceptable for an actor to unexpectedly utter a predetermined line of dialogue that instructed fellow performers to enact lazzi at any time during the performance. Sometimes lazzi could take place in dances or songs accompanied by onstage stringed musical instruments.

== History ==
=== 17th and 18th century Italy ===
Evidence of lazzi's conventionalization within the Italian commedia dell'arte includes visual iconography, paintings, fragmented writings, and personal manuscripts from prominent 16th and 17th century dramatists and actors. One of the earliest accounts can be found in the work of Flaminio Scala, who listed 30 instances of lazzi, though the word "lazzi" was not yet used. Nearly a century later, Andrea Petrucci described lazzi as a fixture of commedia in The Art of The Rehearsal Performance and Improvisation. In Selva over zibaldone di concetti comic raccolti dal P.D. Placidio, Adriani di Lucca provides a list of lazzi from a manuscript that is one of the few extant and intact accounts of lazzi from 17th and 18th century Italy. The manuscript is currently held at the Library in Perugia. Most recently, Mel Gordon compiled a comprehensive collection of lazzi performed by commedia troupes between 1550 and 1750, and organized the descriptions into twelve categories that include 'acrobatic and mimic' as well as 'violence/sadistic behavior' lazzi.

In addition, visual iconography from the 17th and 18th century depicts elements of lazzi that often portray what would have been considered vulgar physical acts (i.e. a doctor administering an enema as seen in the image), though few of the written accounts describe such content. It has been proposed that the marked lack of documentation may be, in part, an attempt to evade rising censorship by authorities, especially in the case of Parisian Comédie-Italienne under the rule of Louis XIV, who threatened troupes with the revocation of royal subsidies should their material be deemed subversive. In some cases, his censorship resulted in a troupe's expulsion from the country. Others theorize that lazzi often went undocumented so that it could not be imitated by competing troupes, as routines could not be patented. Also, it has been suggested that because of the oral and physical nature of the training, as well as the inbred legacy of performers within the troupe, there was less of a need to have written explanations of lazzi.

=== Elizabethan and Jacobean England ===
While the direct influence of Italy's commedia dell'arte on the England's Elizabethan and Jacobean theatre is subject to much debate, verbal and visual lazzi were present in the plays of William Shakespeare. Shakespeare's work implies a familiarity with Italian literature and theatrical practices, though it is not certain that he ever experienced a commedia performance firsthand. It is as likely that Richard Tarlton served as the inspiration for Shakespeare's plays, as well as the lazzi of Italian commedia. Verbal lazzi were used in the form of puns, proverbs, and malapropisms, while instances of physical lazzi were abundant, especially in the work of Shakespeare's clowns, whose improvisations during performances often vexed the playwright.

=== 1920s and modern lazzi ===
More recent appropriations of lazzi include the 1920s silent films of Charlie Chaplin, the silent/sound films and stage productions of Laurel and Hardy, and Punch and Judy puppet shows. While many similarities exist, a few parallels can be drawn in the use of pratfalls, fright jumps, and physical settings that enable the use of objects to perform the comedy. One popular comparison is Charlie Chaplin's cane to Arlecchino, or the Harlequin's stick when used as a comedic device.

== Examples ==
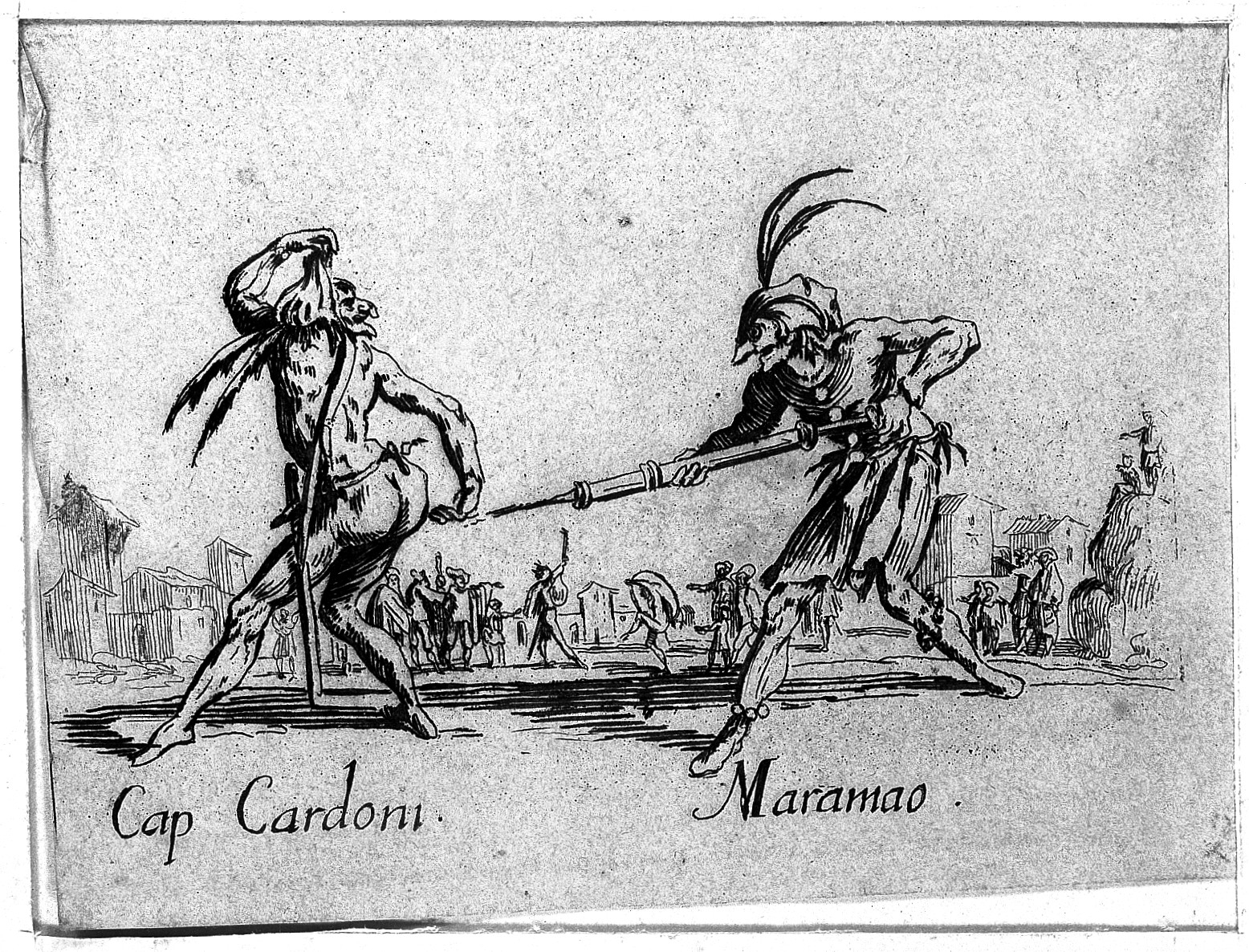
Two commedia dell'arte performers using a clyster

The following list contains a few examples of 17th and 18th century lazzi that were found in the notes and manuscripts of actors and dramatists. The term "lazzo" refers to lazzi in the singular:

- Lazzo of the Fly (17th century Italy): servant stock character tells master that there is "not a fly" in his home. Master enters to find it is full of people. Servant insists that there are still "no flies".
- Lazzo of Water: (17th century Italy): the mistress has fainted. Female servant asks the male servant, usually an Arlecchino or Pulcinella, to fetch water. After splashing many kinds of water on her face, the male servant splashes his own urine on the fainted mistress, and she is revived.
- Lazzo of Begging (17th century Italy): a servant character/low status stock character pretends to be a beggar by hiding his limbs from passers-by.
- Lazzo of the School of Humanity (17th century Italy): Arlecchino, or other servant stock character insists that female relative runs a "school of humanity". The female relative is a prostitute.
- Lazzo of the Barber (17th century Paris): clown/servant stock character shaves male character of higher status and replaces fresh drinking water with the contaminated shave remnants.
- Lazzo of Eating Oneself (18th century Paris): clown/servant stock character, who is traditionally always hungry, eats himself.
- Lazzo of the Straw (17th century Paris): a high status character pours wine into a wine glass while his servant empties the cup through a straw.
- Lazzo of the Invisible Blow (17th century Paris): a comic routine where a character reacts as if they are being hit or attacked by an unseen force.
