= Outline of culture =

Social behavior and norms of a society

The following outline is provided as an overview of and topical guide to culture:

Culture (/ˈkʌltʃər/ KUL-chər or /ˈkʊltʃər/ KUUL-chər) is a concept that encompasses the social behavior, institutions, and norms found in human societies, as well as the knowledge, beliefs, arts, laws, customs, capabilities, attitudes, and habits of the individuals in these groups. Culture often originates from or is attributed to a specific region or location.

Humans acquire culture through the learning processes of enculturation and socialization, which is shown by the diversity of cultures across societies. A cultural norm codifies acceptable conduct in society; it serves as a guideline for behavior, dress, language, and demeanor in a situation, which serves as a template for expectations in a social group. Accepting only a monoculture in a social group can bear risks, just as a single species can wither in the face of environmental change, for lack of functional responses to such change. Thus in military culture, valor is counted as a typical behavior for an individual, and duty, honor, and loyalty to the social group are regarded as virtues or functional responses in the continuum of conflict. In religion, analogous attributes can be identified in a social group.

== Elements of culture ==
- The arts – vast subdivision of culture, composed of many creative endeavors and disciplines. The arts encompasses visual arts, literary arts and the performing arts.
  - Clothing – Fashion, jewelry
  - Gastronomy – the art and science of good eating, including the study of food and culture.
    - Food preparation – act of preparing foods for eating. It encompasses a vast range of methods, tools, and combinations of ingredients to improve the flavour and digestibility of food.
    - Food, human food and drink
      - Cuisines – a cuisine is a specific set of cooking traditions and practices, often associated with a specific culture.
      - Chocolate – raw or processed food produced from the seed of the Mars Theobroma cacao tree.
      - Wine – alcoholic beverage, made of fermented fruit juice, usually from grapes.
  - Literature – the art of written works.
    - Children's literature – stories, books, and poems for children.
    - Fiction – any form of narrative which deals, in part or whole, with events that are not factual, but rather, imaginary and invented by its author(s). See below.
    - Non-fiction – a form of any narrative, account, or other communicative work whose assertions and descriptions are understood to be factual.
    - Poetry – literary art in which language is used for its aesthetic and evocative qualities in addition to, or instead of, its apparent meaning.
    - Critical theory – examination and critique of society and culture, drawing from knowledge across the social sciences and humanities.
  - Performing arts – those forms of art that use the artist's own body, face, and presence as a medium.
    - Circus – performance of a company of clowns, acrobats, trained animals, trapeze artists, musicians, hoopers, tightrope walkers, jugglers, unicyclists and other object-manipulating and stunt-oriented artists, and a ringmaster.
    - Comedy – any discourse or work generally intended to be humorous or to amuse by inducing laughter, especially in theatre, television, film and stand-up comedy.
      - Stand-up comedy – performance by a comedian in front of a live audience, usually speaking directly to them.
    - Dance – art form of movement of the body, usually rhythmic and to music, used as a form of expression, social interaction, or presented in a spiritual or performance setting.
    - Film – moving pictures, the art form that records performances visually.
    - Theatre – a collaborative form of fine art that uses live performers to present the experience of a real or imagined event before a live audience in a specific place.
    - Music – an art form the medium of which is sound and silence.
      - Music genres
        - Jazz – a musical style that originated at the beginning of the 20th century in African American communities in the Southern United States, mixing African and European music traditions.
        - Opera – an art form in which singers and musicians perform a dramatic work combining text (called a libretto) and musical score.
      - Musical instruments – devices created or adapted to make musical sounds.
        - Guitars – the guitar is a plucked string instrument, usually played with fingers or a pick. The guitar consists of a body with a rigid neck to which the strings, generally six in number, are attached. Guitars are traditionally constructed of various woods and strung with animal gut or, more recently, with either nylon or steel strings.
    - Stagecraft – technical aspects of theatrical, film, and video production. It includes, but is not limited to, constructing and rigging scenery, hanging and focusing of lighting, design and procurement of costumes, makeup, procurement of props, stage management, and recording and mixing of sound.
  - Visual arts – art forms that create primarily visual works.
    - Architecture – The art and science of designing and erecting buildings and other physical structures.
      - Classical architecture – the architecture of classical antiquity and later architectural styles influenced by it.
    - Crafts – recreational activities and hobbies that involve making things with one's hands and skill.
    - Design – the process for planning the overall look of an object
    - Drawing – visual art that makes use of any number of drawing instruments to mark a two-dimensional medium.
    - Film – moving pictures.
    - Painting – the practice of applying paint, pigment, colour or another medium to a surface with a brush or other object.
      - History of painting
    - Photography – art, science, and practice of creating pictures by recording radiation on a radiation-sensitive medium, such as a photographic film, or electronic image sensors.
    - Sculpture – three-dimensional artwork created by shaping or combining hard materials - typically stone such as marble - or metal, glass, or wood.
    - Television broadcasting – form of broadcasting in which a television signal is transmitted by radio waves from a terrestrial (Earth based) transmitter of a television station to TV receivers having an antenna.
- Entertainment – any activity which provides a diversion or permits people to amuse themselves in their leisure time. Entertainment is generally passive, such as watching opera or a movie.
  - Fiction – any form of narrative which deals, in part or whole, with events that are not factual, but rather, imaginary and invented by its author(s).
    - Fantasy – genre of fiction using magic and the supernatural as primary elements of plot, theme or setting, often in imaginary worlds, generally avoiding the technical/scientific content typical of Science fiction, but overlapping with it
    - Science fiction – a genre of fiction dealing with imaginary but more or less plausible (or at least nonsupernatural) content such as future settings, futuristic science and technology, space travel, aliens, and paranormal abilities. Exploring the consequences of scientific innovations is one purpose of science fiction, making it a "literature of ideas."
  - Games – structured playing, usually undertaken for enjoyment, involving goals, rules, challenge, and interaction.
    - Board games
      - Chess – two-player board game played on a chessboard, a square-checkered board with 64 squares arranged in an eight-by-eight grid. Each player begins the game with sixteen pieces: One king, one queen, two rooks, two knights, two bishops, and eight pawns.
    - Card games
      - Poker – family of card games that share betting rules and usually (but not always) hand rankings.
    - Video games – electronic games that involve interaction with a user interface to generate visual feedback on a video device.
  - Performing arts – those forms of art that use the artist's own body, face, and presence as a medium. See above.
  - Sports – organized, competitive, entertaining, and skilful activity requiring commitment, strategy, and fair play, in which a winner can be defined by objective means. Generally speaking, a sport is a game based in physical athleticism.
    - Ball games
      - Baseball – bat-and-ball sport played between two teams of nine players each. The aim is to score runs by hitting a thrown ball with a bat and touching a series of four bases arranged at the corners of a ninety-foot diamond.
      - Basketball – team sport in which two teams of five players try to score points by throwing or "shooting" a ball through the top of a basketball hoop while following a set of rules.
      - Tennis – sport usually played between two players (singles) or between two teams of two players each (doubles), using specialized racquets to strike a felt-covered hollow rubber ball over a net into the opponent's court.
    - Canoeing and kayaking – two closely related forms of watercraft paddling, involving manually propelling and navigating specialized boats called canoes and kayaks using a blade that is joined to a shaft, known as a paddle, in the water.
    - Combat sports
      - Fencing – family of combat sports using bladed weapons.
      - Martial arts – extensive systems of codified practices and traditions of combat, practised for a variety of reasons, including self-defence, competition, physical health and fitness, as well as mental and spiritual development.
    - Cycling sport – bicycle racing and track cycling.
    - Motorcycling – riding a motorcycle. A variety of subcultures and lifestyles have been built up around motorcycling and motorcycle racing.
    - Running – moving rapidly on foot, during which both feet are off the ground at regular intervals.
- Humanities – academic disciplines that study the human condition, using methods that are primarily analytical, critical, or speculative, as distinguished from the mainly empirical approaches of the natural sciences.
  - Area studies – comprehensive interdisciplinary research and the academic study of the people and communities of particular regions. Disciplines applied to include history, political science, sociology, cultural studies, languages, geography, literature, and related disciplines.
    - Sinology – study of China and things related to China, such as its classical language and literature.
  - Classical studies – a branch of the Humanities comprising the languages, literature, philosophy, history, art, archaeology and all other cultural elements of the ancient Mediterranean world (Bronze Age ca. BC 3000 – Late Antiquity ca. AD 300–600); especially Ancient Greece and Ancient Rome.
- Mass media – diversified media technologies and their content that are intended to reach a large audience by mass communication. Includes radio and television programming; mass publishing of books, magazines, and newspapers; web content; and films and audio recordings.
- Tradition – belief or behaviour passed down within a group or society with symbolic meaning or special significance with origins in the past. Common examples include holidays or impractical but socially meaningful clothes (like lawyer wigs or military officer spurs), but the idea has also been applied to social norms such as greetings.
  - Celebration –
    - Festivals – entertainment events centring on and celebrating a unique aspect of a community, usually staged by that community.
- Tourism – travel for recreational, leisure, or business purposes. The World Tourism Organization defines tourists as people "travelling to and staying in places outside their usual environment for not more than one consecutive year for leisure, business and other purposes." Tourism is important, and in some cases, vital for many countries. It was recognized in the Manila Declaration on World Tourism of 1980 as "an activity essential to the life of nations because of its direct effects on the social, cultural, educational, and economic sectors of national societies and their international relations."
  - Tourist attraction – place of interest where tourists visit, typically for its inherent or exhibited natural or cultural value, historical significance, natural or built beauty, offering leisure, adventure and amusement.
    - Lists of tourist attractions

== Types of cultures ==
- Organizational culture – behaviour of humans within an organization and the meaning that people attach to those behaviours. An organization's culture includes its vision, values, norms, systems, countries, symbols, language, assumptions, beliefs, and habits.

=== Cultures by aspect ===
- Consumer culture – a society based on consumption
- High context culture – a culture with the tendency use high context messages, resulting in catering towards in-groups
- Low context culture – culture with a tendency not to cater towards in-groups
- Non-institutional culture - culture that is emerging bottom-up from self-organizing grassroot initiatives, rather than top-down from the state
- Participatory culture – a culture in which private persons (the public) do not act as consumers only, but also as contributors or producers (prosumers)
- Permission culture – a society in which copyright restrictions are pervasive and enforced to the extent that any uses of copyrighted works need to be explicitly leased
- Remix culture – a society which allows and encourages derivative works
- Traditional culture – a community that chooses to remain focused on subsistence as a major cornerstone of their economic behaviour, as well as, adheres to their ancestral belief-systems and mannerism.

=== Cultural cross-sections ===
- Animal culture – cultural phenomena pertaining to animals
- Children's culture – cultural phenomena pertaining to children
  - Children's street culture – cumulative culture created by young children
- Coffee culture – social atmosphere or series of associated social behaviors that depends heavily upon coffee, particularly as a social lubricant
- Culture of capitalism – the lifestyle of the people living within a capitalist society, and the effects of a global or national capitalist economy on a population
- Cyberculture – cultural phenomena pertaining to cyberspace
- DIY culture – refers to a wide range of elements in non-mainstream society, such as grassroots political and social activism, independent music, art, and film
- Dominant culture – the established language, religion, behavior, values, rituals, and social customs of a society
- Drinking culture – the customs and practices of people who drink alcoholic beverages
- Folk culture (Folklore) – traditional culture; traditional cultural traits of a community
- High culture – “transcendent” in two ways: internationally and timeless
- Low culture – non-transcendent; “not worth” studying or researching
- Media culture
- Official culture
- Political culture
  - Civic political culture
- Popular culture – totality of ideas, perspectives, attitudes, memes, images and other phenomena that permeate the everyday lives of a given society, especially those heavily influenced by mass media.
- Print culture
- Safety culture – the way in which safety is managed in the workplace, which often reflects "the attitudes, beliefs, perceptions and values that employees share in relation to safety."
- Tea culture
- Trash culture
- Urban culture
- Vernacular culture
- Women's culture (Cultural feminism)
- Youth culture - refers to the societal norms of children, adolescents, and young adults. Specifically, it comprises the processes and symbolic systems that are shared by the youth demographic and are distinct from those of adults in the community.

=== Subcultures ===
Subculture

- Lifestyle enclave

==== Types of cultures ====
- Alternative culture
- Microculture

==== Specific subcultures ====
- Association football culture
- Cycling subculture – a culture that supports, encourages, and has high bicycle usage
- Deaf culture – social beliefs, behaviors, art, literary traditions, history, values and shared institutions of communities that are affected by deafness and which use sign languages as the main means of communication. When used as a cultural label, the word "deaf" is often written with a capital D, and referred to as "big D Deaf" in speech and sign.
- Ethical culture
- Horse culture – a community whose day-to-day life revolves around the herding and breeding of horses
- LGBT culture
- Modern juggling culture
- Surf culture
- Video game culture

== Academic disciplines that study culture ==
- Science
- Anthropology
  - Cultural anthropology – branch of anthropology focused on the study of cultural variation.
- Archaeology – history studies in the physical aspects or artefacts of cultures.
  - culture-historical archaeology
  - Sociocultural evolution
- Biology
  - Sociobiology
  - Social neuroscience
  - Cultural neuroscience
- Cultural history – an academic discipline that combines the approaches of anthropology and history to look at popular cultural traditions and cultural interpretations of historical experience. It examines the records and narrative descriptions of past knowledge, customs, and arts of a group of people.
- Cultural studies – an academic discipline that studies the forces from which the whole of humankind construct their daily lives. It seeks to understand how meaning is generated and disseminated through practices, beliefs, and political, economic, or social structures within a given culture.
  - Ethnic studies
  - Popular culture studies – generally considered a combination of communication studies and cultural studies, it analyzes popular culture from a critical theory perspective.
- Culturology – social science concerned with the scientific understanding, description, analysis and prediction of cultural activities.
- Culture theory – seeks to define the heuristic concept of culture in operational or scientific terms.
- Human geography – social science that studies the world, its people, communities, and cultures with an emphasis on relations of and across space and place.
- Philosophy of culture
- Psychology
  - Evolutionary psychology
  - Cultural psychology
- Sociology – scientific study of human society. The traditional focuses of sociology have included social stratification, social class, culture, social mobility, religion, secularization, law, and deviance.
  - Sociology of culture
- Sound culture – an interdisciplinary field which considers "the material production and consumption of music, sound, noise and silence, and how these have changed throughout history and within different societies, but does this from a much broader perspective than standard disciplines."
- Visual culture

== Cultures of the world ==
=== Area studies ===
Area studies

- Classical studies
- Sinology
- Internet studies
  - Internet culture
    - Lurker
    - Netizen
    - Social media
    - Femboy

=== Cultures of continents and major geopolitical regions ===
- Culture of Africa
- Culture of Antarctica
- Culture of Asia
- Culture of Europe
- Culture of North America
- Culture of Oceania
  - Culture of Australia
- Culture of South America

=== Cultures by political divisions of the World ===
(arranged by continent or major geopolitical region)

==== Cultures of Africa ====
Culture of Africa

- West Africa
  - Culture of Benin
  - Culture of Burkina Faso
  - Culture of Cape Verde
  - Culture of Ivory Coast
  - Culture of the Gambia
  - Culture of Ghana
  - Culture of Guinea
  - Culture of Guinea-Bissau
  - Culture of Liberia
  - Culture of Mali
  - Culture of Mauritania
  - Culture of Niger
  - Culture of Nigeria
  - Culture of Senegal
  - Culture of Sierra Leone
  - Culture of Togo
- North Africa
  - Culture of Algeria
  - Culture of Egypt
  - Culture of Libya
  - Culture of Mauritania
  - Culture of Morocco
  - Culture of Sudan
  - Culture of Tunisia
  - Culture of Western Sahara
- Central Africa
  - Culture of Angola
  - Culture of Burundi
  - Culture of Cameroon
  - Culture of the Central African Republic
  - Culture of Chad
  - Culture of the Democratic Republic of the Congo
  - Culture of Equatorial Guinea
  - Culture of Gabon
  - Culture of the Republic of the Congo
  - Culture of Rwanda
  - Culture of São Tomé and Príncipe
- East Africa
  - Culture of Burundi
  - Culture of Comoros
  - Culture of Djibouti
  - Culture of Eritrea
  - Culture of Ethiopia
  - Culture of Kenya
  - Culture of Madagascar
  - Culture of Malawi
  - Culture of Mauritius
  - Culture of Mozambique
  - Culture of Rwanda
  - Culture of Seychelles
  - Culture of Somalia
  - Culture of South Sudan
  - Culture of Tanzania
  - Culture of Uganda
  - Culture of Zambia
  - Culture of Zimbabwe
- Southern Africa
  - Culture of Botswana
  - Culture of Lesotho
  - Culture of Namibia
  - Culture of South Africa
  - Culture of Swaziland
- Dependencies in Africa
  - Culture of the British Indian Ocean Territory (UK)
  - Culture of Mayotte (France)
  - Culture of Réunion (France)
  - Culture of Saint Helena (UK)
  - Culture of the Canary Islands (Spain)
  - Culture of Ceuta (Spain)
  - Culture of Madeira (Portugal)
  - Culture of Melilla (Spain)
  - Culture of Socotra (Yemen)
  - Culture of Puntland
  - Culture of Somaliland
  - Culture of the Sahrawi Arab Democratic Republic

==== Culture of Antarctica ====
- No political divisions and no permanent population

==== Cultures of Asia ====
Culture of Asia

- Central Asia
  - Culture of Kazakhstan
  - Culture of Kyrgyzstan
  - Culture of Tajikistan
  - Culture of Turkmenistan
  - Culture of Uzbekistan
- East Asia
  - Culture of China
    - Culture of Tibet
    - Special Administrative regions of China
      - Culture of Hong Kong
      - Culture of Macau
  - Culture of Japan
  - Culture of North Korea
  - Culture of South Korea
  - Culture of Mongolia
  - Culture of Taiwan
- North Asia
  - Culture of Russia
- Southeast Asia
  - Culture of Brunei
  - Culture of Burma
  - Culture of Cambodia
  - Culture of East Timor
  - Culture of Indonesia
  - Culture of Laos
  - Culture of Malaysia
  - Culture of the Philippines
  - Culture of Singapore
  - Culture of Thailand
  - Culture of Vietnam
- South Asia
  - Culture of Afghanistan
  - Culture of Bangladesh
  - Culture of Bhutan
  - Culture of India
  - Culture of Iran
  - Culture of Maldives
  - Culture of Nepal
  - Culture of Pakistan
  - Culture of Sri Lanka
- West Asia
  - Culture of Armenia
  - Culture of Azerbaijan
  - Culture of Bahrain
  - Culture of Cyprus
    - Culture of Northern Cyprus
  - Culture of Georgia
  - Culture of Iraq
  - Culture of Israel
  - Culture of Jordan
  - Culture of Kuwait
  - Culture of Lebanon
  - Culture of Oman
  - Culture of Palestine
  - Culture of Qatar
  - Culture of Saudi Arabia
  - Culture of Syria
  - Culture of Turkey
  - Culture of the United Arab Emirates
  - Culture of Yemen

==== Cultures of the Caucasus ====
(a region considered to be in both Asia and Europe or between them)

- North Caucasus
  - Parts of Russia
    - Culture of Chechnya
    - Culture of Ingushetia
    - Culture of Dagestan
    - Culture of Adyghea
    - Culture of Kabardino-Balkaria
    - Culture of Karachay–Cherkessia
    - Culture of North Ossetia
    - Culture of Krasnodar Krai
    - Culture of Stavropol Krai
- South Caucasus
  - Culture of Georgia
    - Culture of Abkhazia
    - Culture of South Ossetia
  - Culture of Armenia
  - Culture of Azerbaijan
    - Culture of Nagorno-Karabakh

==== Cultures of Europe ====
Culture of Europe

- Culture of Akrotiri and Dhekelia
- Culture of Åland
- Culture of Albania
- Culture of Andorra
- Culture of Armenia
- Culture of Austria
- Culture of Azerbaijan
- Culture of Belarus
- Culture of Belgium
- Culture of Bosnia and Herzegovina
- Culture of Bulgaria
- Culture of Croatia
- Culture of Cyprus
- Culture of the Czech Republic
- Culture of Denmark
- Culture of Estonia
- Culture of the Faroe Islands
- Culture of Finland
- Culture of France
- Culture of Georgia
- Culture of Germany
- Culture of Gibraltar
- Culture of Greece
- Culture of Guernsey
- Culture of Hungary
- Culture of Iceland
- Culture of the Republic of Ireland
- Culture of the Isle of Man
- Culture of Italy
- Culture of Jersey
- Culture of Kazakhstan
- Culture of Kosovo
- Culture of Latvia
- Culture of Liechtenstein
- Culture of Lithuania
- Culture of Luxembourg
- Culture of Malta
- Culture of Moldova
  - Culture of Transnistria
- Culture of Monaco
- Culture of Montenegro
- Culture of the Netherlands
- Culture of North Macedonia
- Culture of Norway
- Culture of Poland
- Culture of Portugal
- Culture of Romania
- Culture of Russia
- Culture of San Marino
- Culture of Serbia
- Culture of Slovakia
- Culture of Slovenia
- Culture of Spain
- Culture of Svalbard
- Culture of Sweden
- Culture of Switzerland
- Culture of Turkey
- Culture of Ukraine
- Culture of the United Kingdom
  - Culture of England
    - Culture of Cornwall
    - Culture of Sussex
    - Culture of Yorkshire
  - Culture of Northern Ireland
  - Culture of Scotland
  - Culture of Wales
- Culture of Vatican City
- Culture of the European Union

==== Cultures of North America ====
Culture of North America

- Culture of Canada
  - Culture of Alberta
  - Culture of British Columbia
  - Culture of Manitoba
  - Culture of New Brunswick
  - Culture of Newfoundland and Labrador
  - Culture of Nova Scotia
  - Culture of Ontario
  - Culture of Prince Edward Island
  - Culture of Quebec
  - Culture of Saskatchewan
- Culture of Greenland
- Culture of Mexico
- Culture of Saint Pierre and Miquelon
- Culture of the United States
  - Culture of Alabama
  - Culture of Alaska
  - Culture of Arizona
  - Culture of Arkansas
  - Culture of California
  - Culture of Colorado
  - Culture of Connecticut
  - Culture of Delaware
  - Culture of Florida
  - Culture of Georgia
  - Culture of Hawaii
  - Culture of Idaho
  - Culture of Illinois
  - Culture of Indiana
  - Culture of Iowa
  - Culture of Montana
  - Culture of Kansas
  - Culture of Kentucky
  - Culture of Louisiana
  - Culture of Maine
  - Culture of Maryland
  - Culture of Massachusetts
  - Culture of Michigan
  - Culture of Minnesota
  - Culture of Mississippi
  - Culture of Missouri
  - Culture of Nebraska
  - Culture of Nevada
  - Culture of New Hampshire
  - Culture of New Jersey
  - Culture of New Mexico
  - Culture of New York
  - Culture of North Carolina
  - Culture of North Dakota
  - Culture of Ohio
  - Culture of Oklahoma
  - Culture of Oregon
  - Culture of Pennsylvania
  - Culture of Rhode Island
  - Culture of South Carolina
  - Culture of South Dakota
  - Culture of Tennessee
  - Culture of Texas
  - Culture of Utah
  - Culture of Vermont
  - Culture of Virginia
  - Culture of Washington
  - Culture of West Virginia
  - Culture of Wisconsin
  - Culture of Wyoming
  - Culture of Washington, D.C.
- Central America
  - Culture of Belize
  - Culture of Costa Rica
  - Culture of El Salvador
  - Culture of Guatemala
  - Culture of Honduras
  - Culture of Nicaragua
  - Culture of Panama
- Caribbean
  - Culture of Anguilla
  - Culture of Antigua and Barbuda
  - Culture of Aruba
  - Culture of the Bahamas
  - Culture of Barbados
  - Culture of Bermuda
  - Culture of the British Virgin Islands
  - Culture of the Cayman Islands
  - Culture of Cuba
  - Culture of Dominica
  - Culture of the Dominican Republic
  - Culture of Grenada
  - Culture of Guadeloupe
  - Culture of Haiti
  - Culture of Jamaica
  - Culture of Martinique
  - Culture of Montserrat
  - Culture of Navassa Island
  - Culture of the Netherlands Antilles
  - Culture of Puerto Rico
  - Culture of Saint Barthélemy
  - Culture of Saint Kitts and Nevis
  - Culture of Saint Lucia
  - Culture of Saint Martin
  - Culture of Saint Vincent and the Grenadines
  - Culture of Trinidad and Tobago
  - Culture of the Turks and Caicos Islands
  - Culture of the United States Virgin Islands

==== Cultures of Oceania ====
Culture of Oceania

- Australasia
  - Culture of Australia
    - Dependencies/Territories of Australia
      - Culture of Christmas Island
      - Culture of the Cocos (Keeling) Islands
      - Culture of Norfolk Island
  - Culture of New Zealand
  - Melanesia
    - Culture of Fiji
    - Culture of Indonesia
    - Culture of New Caledonia (France)
    - Culture of Papua New Guinea
    - Culture of the Solomon Islands
    - Culture of Vanuatu
  - Micronesia
    - Culture of the Federated States of Micronesia
    - Culture of Guam (US)
    - Culture of Kiribati
    - Culture of the Marshall Islands
    - Culture of Nauru
    - Culture of the Northern Mariana Islands (US)
    - Culture of Palau
    - Culture of Wake Island (US)
  - Polynesia
    - Culture of American Samoa (US)
    - Culture of the Chatham Islands (NZ)
    - Culture of the Cook Islands (NZ)
    - Culture of Easter Island (Chile)
    - Culture of French Polynesia (France)
    - Culture of Hawaii (US)
    - Culture of the Loyalty Islands (France)
    - Culture of Niue (NZ)
    - Culture of the Pitcairn Islands (UK)
    - Culture of Adamstown
    - Culture of Samoa
    - Culture of Tokelau (NZ)
    - Culture of Tonga
    - Culture of Tuvalu
    - Culture of Wallis and Futuna (France)

==== Cultures of South America ====
Culture of South America

- Culture of Argentina
- Culture of Bolivia
- Culture of Brazil
- Culture of Chile
- Culture of Colombia
- Culture of Ecuador
- Culture of the Falkland Islands
- Culture of French Guiana
- Culture of Guyana
- Culture of Paraguay
- Culture of Peru
- Culture of Suriname
- Culture of Uruguay
- Culture of Venezuela

==== Cultures of the South America ====
- Culture of Ascension Island
- Culture of Saint Helena
- Culture of Tristan da Cunha

== History of culture ==
=== Cultural histories ===
==== By period ====
- Culture during the Cold War

==== By region ====
- Cultural history of the United States
- Cultural history of Taiwan
- History of Lithuanian culture
- History of Russian culture

==== By subject ====
- Earth in culture
- World War II in contemporary culture
- Medieval maritime culture

=== Historical cultures ===
- Chinese culture
- Culture of ancient Greece
- Culture of ancient Rome
- Culture of ancient Rus
- Clovis culture
- Mississippian culture
- Vinca culture
- Human sacrifice in Aztec culture

== Politics of culture ==
- The arts and politics – as they respond to contemporaneous events and politics, the arts take on political as well as social dimensions, becoming themselves a focus of controversy and even a force of political as well as social change.
- Culture change –
- Culture of fear –
- Culture of life –
- Culture minister –
- Official culture –
- Political culture –

== Sociology of culture ==
- Animal culture –
- Constructed culture –
- Counterculture –
- Cross-cultural communication –
- Cultural bias –
- Cultural dissonance –
- Cultural evolution –
- Cultural icon –
- Cultural imperialism –
- Cultural movement –
- Cultural phenomenon –
- Cultural system –
- Cultural universals –
- Culture assimilators –
- Culture clash
- Culture gap –
- Culture hero –
- Culture industry –
- Culture note –
- Culture of poverty –
- Culture shock –
- Culture theory –
- Culture speculation –
- Culture war –
- Death and culture –
- Demographics –
- Emotions and culture –
- Ethnocentrism –
- High culture –
- Intercultural competence –
- Low culture –
- Right to science and culture –
- Social fact –
- Symbolic culture –
- Third culture kid –
- Transformation of culture –
- Trash culture –
- Urban culture –

== Research fields ==
- Semiotics of culture – studies culture in relation to language and as a symbolic system of signs

== See also ==
- Outlines of culture and arts
