= Culture of Georgia (U.S. state) =

The culture of Georgia is a subculture of the Southern United States that has come from blending heavy amounts of English and rural Scots-Irish culture with the culture of African Americans and Native Americans. Southern culture remains prominent in the rural Southern and the Appalachian areas of the state. Georgians share a history with the other Southern states that includes the institution of slavery, the American Civil War, Reconstruction, the Great Depression, segregation, and the civil rights movement.

The people of Georgia are stereotyped both by their manners and for being highly religious. Language in Georgia is a combination of several different sub-dialects of Southern American English found in different areas of the state. The state's culture is also influenced by its economy, most notably from forestry and its many benefits to the state and its people. Finally, Georgia's cuisine is integral to its culture with such foods as seafood, cornbread, peaches and grits being part of the people of Georgia's diet and economy.

On a more abstract level, Georgia's culture can be seen and heard in its literature, music, sports, film, television and art. Georgia is known for such authors as Alice Walker and Margaret Mitchell; for musicians and bands such as R.E.M. and Ray Charles; for interest in football, hunting and fishing; for the films and television shows filmed in the state and the actors and actresses from Georgia; and for the art created by Georgians and inspired by the state of Georgia.

Georgia's culture originated with its settlement by British colonists after the founding of the colony by James Edward Oglethorpe in 1732. The early colonists were mostly English though there were also significant amounts of Scots-Irish, Salzburgers, Italians, Sephardic Jews, Moravians and Swiss, among others. It is the amalgamation of these disparate ethnicities, along with the influx of African slaves and their descendants, which has created the modern culture of the state and the modern Georgian.

Stereotypical Georgian traits include manners known as "Southern hospitality", a strong sense of community and shared culture, and a distinctive Southern dialect. Georgia's Southern heritage makes turkey and dressing a traditional holiday dish during both Thanksgiving and Christmas. Movies like Gone with the Wind and the book If I Ever Get Back to Georgia, I'm Gonna Nail My Feet to the Ground by Lewis Grizzard lampoon (and celebrate) Georgia culture, speech and mannerisms.

== Religion ==
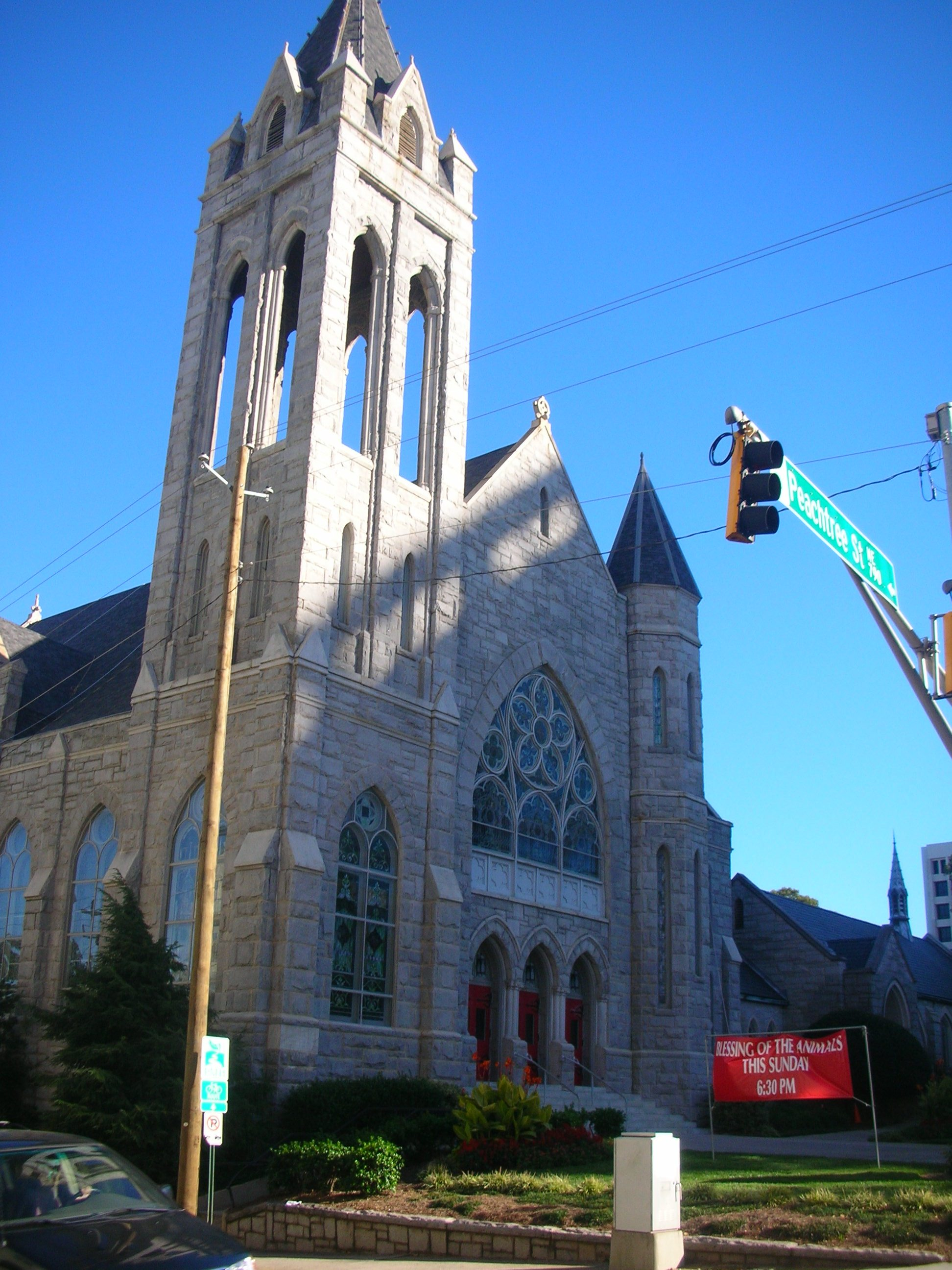
Saint Mark United Methodist church

As with the rest of the South, Georgia is highly religious, with the predominant religion in the state being Christianity. In fact, 85% of Georgians are Christians with 76% of those being Protestant, 8% Catholic and 1% designated as Other; 13% of the population have no religion and 2% are of a religion other than Christianity. Georgia is home to several historic religious sites. Among them are Congregation Mickve Israel, located in Savannah, Georgia; Ebenezer Baptist Church in Atlanta, Georgia; Kiokee Baptist Church located in Appling, Georgia; Shrine of the Black Madonna of Atlanta; and Springfield Baptist Church in Augusta, Georgia.

The state is also the home of four prominent seminaries. They are the Candler School of Theology, Emory University in Atlanta; Columbia Theological Seminary in Decatur, Georgia; the Interdenominational Theological Center of Atlanta; and the Luther Rice University in Lithonia, Georgia.

== Southern dialect in Georgia ==
The Southern dialect in Georgia is made up of several sub dialects of Southern American English. For instance, the Coastal Southern dialect as well as the Gullah language, a dialect spoken by African American communities, can be found along Georgia's coast. Southern Appalachian English is found primarily in north Georgia; however, the dialect spoken in other areas such as Glascock County is virtually indistinguishable from Southern Appalachian.

== Forestry ==
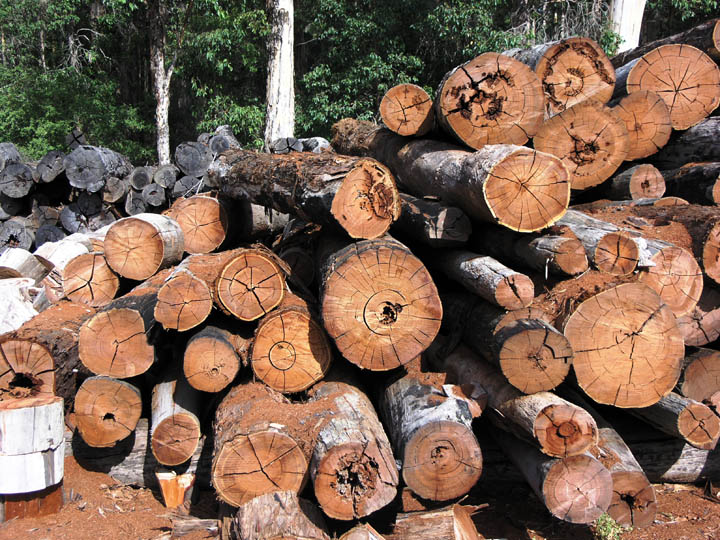
Timber in storage for later processing at a sawmill

Georgia leads the United States in timber production, and timber is its highest valued agricultural product. Georgia is second in the nation with more than 3,800 certified Tree Farms that total nearly eight million acres. Moreover, Georgia was the first state in the nation to license foresters and today the state has about 1,200 licensed foresters. The timber industry generates 177,000 jobs and 66% of a total land area of 36,800,000 acres (149,000 km^{2}) is forested.

Georgia's forests benefit the state and its people greatly by providing habitats for diverse wildlife. Such diversity allows for much outdoor recreation, including hunting, fishing, birdwatching and hiking. Each year, more than two million people enjoy wildlife-related activities in Georgia, directly contributing more than $1.6 billion to the state's economy.

It was "pitch" pine trees that were plentiful in Georgia, but settlers from the early 19th century pronounced the word as "peach", thus giving the state their nickname.

== Cuisine ==
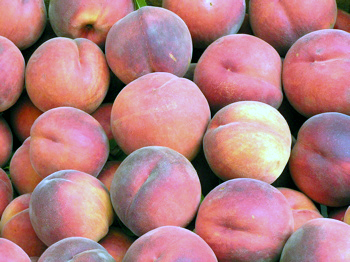
Peaches

Georgia's cuisine includes a variety of different foods ranging from seafood, corn on the cob and chicken and dumplings to Brunswick stew, fried chicken and cornbread. Other well known and beloved foods in the state include pecans, peaches, and peanuts. The state prepared food is grits.

Barbecuing, a favorite pastime in Georgia, is integral to the state's culture. All types of meat are barbecued in Georgia, but pork is traditionally the most popular meat in the state. Many people in Georgia barbecue for tailgate parties, for the Fourth of July or in case of homecomings and in all temperatures. The Georgia General Assembly traditionally holds a "wild hog supper" before legislative sessions and barbecue festivals can be found throughout the state.

== Literature ==
Georgia literature is distinct among the literature of other places in the world in its historical and geographical context and the values it imparts to people who enjoy the state's literature. Dramas such as the play-turned-movie Driving Miss Daisy are one example of Georgia's literary culture while better known fiction novels such as Margaret Mitchell's Gone With the Wind and The Color Purple by Alice Walker (The Color Purple's stage adaptation is by Georgia Author and Agnes Scott Alumna Marsha Norman) are other examples. Among the most interesting of Southern literature's genres is Southern Gothic, with such notable Georgia writers as Flannery O'Connor and Erskine Caldwell. Georgia's poets, such as Sidney Lanier, nonfiction writers like humorist Lewis Grizzard also have a place in the state's literary background.

Many writers in Georgia have looked to their past to better understand their present and the challenges Georgians face today. Some of those authors are Raymond Andrews, Olive Ann Burns, Flannery O'Connor, Marion Montgomery, James Dickey, Mary Hood and Alice Walker. Each of these writers have drawn upon the history of the state and the social and political changes in Georgia to create stories about faith, redemption, race, and other important issues.

== Music ==
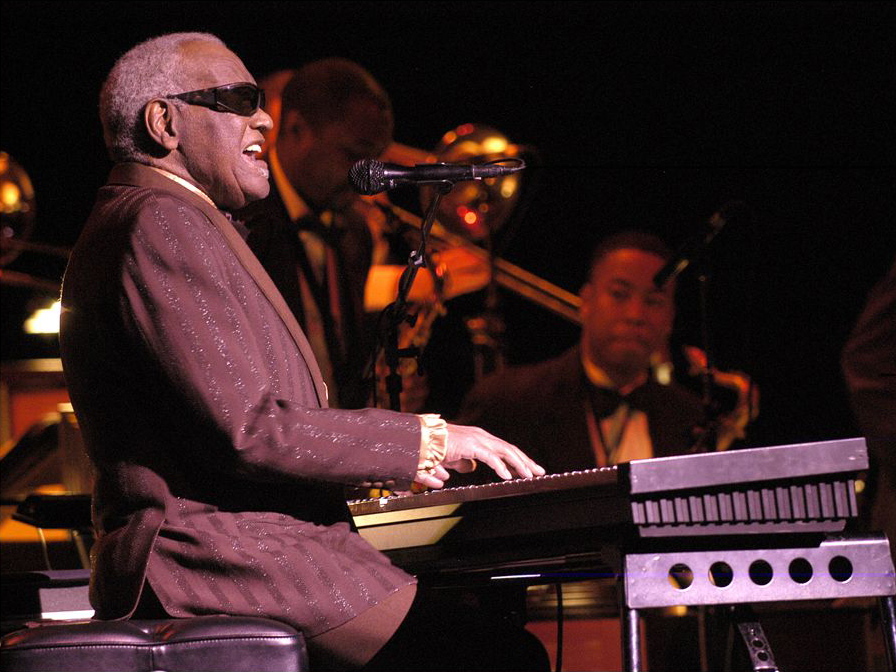
Ray Charles

Music in Georgia ranges from folk music to rhythm and blues, rock and roll, country music, sludge metal and hip hop.

Georgia's folk musical traditions include important contributions to the Piedmont blues, shape note singing and African American music. The "ring shout", an African American musical and dance tradition among the oldest surviving African American performance styles in North America, can still be found in McIntosh County, Georgia where black communities have kept the style alive. The McIntosh County ring shout is a counterclockwise ring dance featuring clapping and stick-beating percussion with call-and-response vocals. The ring shout tradition is strongest in Boldon, Georgia, where it is traditionally performed on New Year's Eve.

The Sacred Harp, compiled and produced by Georgians Benjamin Franklin White and Elisha J. King, was published in 1844. The Sacred Harp system use notes represented by different shapes according to scale degree, intended to make it easy for people to learn to sight-read music and perform complex pieces without a lot of training. Established in 1933, the Sacred Harp Publishing Company, located in Carrollton, Georgia, publishes the most widely used 1991 edition of The Sacred Harp.

Rock legends The Allman Brothers Band formed in Jacksonville, Florida, but moved to Macon, Georgia in 1969 and continued to call Macon home until 1979. The Allman's make numerous musical references to Georgia, in such songs as Hot 'Lanta, their cover of Blind Willie McTell's Statesboro Blues, and Ramblin' Man. Duane Allman famously mentioned Georgia in an interview with Ellen Mandel of Good Times Magazine, when in response to the question "How are you helping the revolution?" Allman replied "I'm hitting a lick for peace. And every time I'm in Georgia, I eat a peach for peace."

The Black Crowes are a group out of Marietta, Georgia that fuse blues, rock, and gospel into a Southern-soul-driven hard-rocking extravaganza with tones of Zeppelin-power and Sunday morning inspiration. The city of Athens, Georgia, home to the University of Georgia has been a fertile field for alternative rock bands since the late 1970s. Notable bands from Athens include R.E.M., The B-52's, Widespread Panic, Drive-By Truckers, as well as bands from the Elephant 6 Recording Company most notably Neutral Milk Hotel.

Rhythm and Blues is another important musical genre in Georgia. Ray Charles was one of popular music's most influential performers, fusing R&B, jazz, and country into many popular songs. Augusta native James Brown and Macon native Little Richard, two important figures in R&B history, started performing in Georgia clubs on the Chitlin' Circuit, fused gospel with blues and boogie-woogie to lay the foundations for R&B and Soul music, and rank among the most iconic musicians of the 20th century. In the 1960s, Atlanta native Gladys Knight proved one of the most popular Motown recording artists, while Otis Redding, born in the small town of Dawson but raised in Macon, defined the grittier Southern soul sound of Memphis-based Stax Records. Atlanta-based OutKast proved one of the first commercially successful Hip-Hop groups from outside of New York City or Los Angeles. In the 1990s and 2000s, Atlanta emerged as the leading center of urban music. Artists like TLC, Usher, 112, T.I., Ludacris, YoungBloodZ, OutKast, Goodie Mob (as well as the Dungeon Family music collective of which both are members), and producers like Organized Noize, L.A. Reid, and Jermaine Dupri, the later of whom founded the successful record labels LaFace and SoSo Def, have blurred musical boundaries by blending R&B singing with Hip-Hop production. More recently, Atlanta is also known as a center of crunk music, an electric bass-driven club music, whose most visible practitioner has been Atlanta-based producer/hype man/rapper Lil Jon. Before moving to Atlanta, Young Jeezy lived in Macon, Georgia.

Several sludge metal groups have emerged from Georgia, incorporating several features of stoner metal and progressive metal. Such bands include Atlanta's Mastodon and Savannah's Baroness and Kylesa, which have recently garnered an international audience.

Opera singer Jessye Norman is native to Augusta. Famous music director Robert Shaw spent much of his time living in Atlanta directing the Atlanta Symphony Orchestra and Chorus. Notable musical groups include the Atlanta Symphony Orchestra, the Atlanta Symphony Chorus, Atlanta Opera, the Georgia Boy Choir, the Atlanta Boy Choir, Atlanta Young Singers, and the Atlanta Symphony Youth Orchestra, as well as symphonies in the cities of Columbus, Macon and Augusta.

== Sports and recreation ==
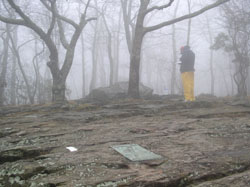
A hiker signs the register at the southern terminus on Springer Mountain

Sports in Georgia include professional teams in all major sports, Olympic Games contenders and medalists, collegiate teams in major and small-school conferences and associations, and active amateur teams and individual sports. The State of Georgia has a team in three of the four major professional leagues (MLB, NFL, NBA).

Georgia has an abundance of outdoor recreational activities. Outdoor activities include, but are not limited to, hiking along the Appalachian Trail; Civil War Heritage Trails; rock climbing and whitewater paddling. Other outdoor activities include hunting and fishing. Less rustic activities are trips to Callaway Gardens; circuses; rattlesnake roundups; and Zoo Atlanta.

== Film ==
Hundreds of feature films have been located in Georgia. In 2016 alone, more than $7 billion had been generated for the state's economy by the film and television industry. Some of these films include Deliverance; Smokey and the Bandit; Driving Miss Daisy and Midnight in the Garden of Good and Evil. Due to the success of Deliverance, Jimmy Carter established a state film commission, now known as the Georgia Film, Video and Music Office, in 1973 to market Georgia as a shooting location for future projects. In 2016, 245 filming projects including: commercials, feature films, television shows and music videos.

Many other films other than the ones listed above have been set in or have used Georgia as a background for their settings. One such film was Forrest Gump, which used a bench in Savannah, Georgia during the film. Fried Green Tomatoes, though set mostly in Alabama a small portion of the novel and film were set in Valdosta Georgia, was filmed in Juliette, Georgia in Monroe County, Georgia. A more recent film, Sweet Home Alabama, was filmed almost entirely in Crawfordville, Georgia.

Year Filmed	Project Title	Project Type	Location
1972	Deliverance	Film	Tallulah Gorge, Clayton and Rabun County
1976	Smokey and the Bandit	Film	McDonough, Jonesboro and Lithonia
1980	Escape from New York City	Film	Atlanta
1982	The Big Chill	Film	Atlanta
1986	Mosquito Coast	Film	Cartersville and Rome
1986	Friday 13th: Jason Lives	Film	Covington
1987	School Daze	Film	Atlanta
1989	Driving Miss Daisy	Film	Atlanta
1989	Glory	Film	Savannah and Jekyll Island
2010	The Last Song	Film	Tybee Island

== Television ==
Georgia Public Broadcasting logo

Georgia is home to Turner Broadcasting System, which launched well-known networks such as TBS, TNT, Turner Classic Movies, CNN and HLN among others; its ownership of Cartoon Network (including Adult Swim) made Georgia a bastion of American television animation. The CNN Center, which houses the news channel's world headquarters, is located in downtown Atlanta, facing Marietta Street, while the home offices of the Turner Entertainment networks are located in midtown, near the Georgia Tech campus, on Techwood Drive. A third Turner building is on Williams Street, directly across Interstate 75 and Interstate 85 from the Techwood Drive campus and is the home of Williams Street, an in-house studio of Cartoon Network.

The Weather Channel's headquarters are located in the Smyrna area of metropolitan Atlanta in Cobb County. WSB-TV was the state's first television station, and the southeastern United States' second. WSB-TV signed on Channel 8 in 1948, and moved to its present-day location on Channel 2 in 1952. Georgia Public Broadcasting (GPB) operates nine major educational television stations across the state as Georgia Public Broadcasting Television.

Like movies, several television shows have been filmed or set in Georgia. The Dukes of Hazzard began filming in Georgia, though it moved to California in later years. In the Heat of the Night was also filmed in Georgia as was the television series I'll Fly Away and its miniseries sequel I'll Fly Away: Then and Now.

== Art ==
Portrait of James Habersham, Sr. by Jeremiah Theüs

The arts and artists have found a home in Georgia since its beginnings as a British Colony. Many artists, from Jill Carnes to Marie Weaver call Georgia their home and the Georgia Museum of Art on the University of Georgia's campus in Athens is the state's official art museum.

The decorative arts - ceramics, furniture, glass, metalwork and textiles—are found throughout the state. This type of art is generally known by its region: Tidewater, Coastal Plain, Piedmont, and Highlands. These regions were settled at different times in the state's history.

Though very few examples exist either in Georgia or in the United States the history of painting in the eighteen and nineteenth centuries in Georgia mirrors the history of painting in the United States. Some early examples of works done in Georgia are the watercolors and pencil sketches done by Philip Georg Friedrich von Reck; the portrait of James Habersham Sr. by the Swiss artist Jeremiah Theüs and John Abbott, a popular watercolor painter of local birds and insects.

== Notable Georgia residents ==
Many notable individuals come from Georgia. Comedian Jeff Foxworthy is an Atlanta native. Actress Julia Roberts is a native of Smyrna, Georgia, a suburb just west of Atlanta. Former U.S. President Jimmy Carter was born in Plains, Georgia. Civil rights leader, Martin Luther King Jr. was born in Atlanta. Ryan Seacrest from Marietta, and baseball legend Jackie Robinson was born in Cairo, Georgia. Other notable people from Georgia include Otis Redding, Little Richard, Travis Tritt, AJ Styles and Alice Walker.

== See also ==
- Outline of culture
- Outline of Georgia (U.S. state)
- History of Georgia (U.S. state)
- Culture of Atlanta, Georgia
- African-American culture
