= Culture of Georgia =

The culture of Georgia may refer to:

- Culture of Georgia (country)
- Culture of Georgia (U.S. state)

== See also ==
- Georgian era
