= Bahamian literature =

Bahamian literature is literature written or produced in the Bahamas or by Bahamians.

== Humanities ==
=== History ===
"Islanders in the Stream: A History of the Bahamian People: Volume One: From Aboriginal Times to the End of Slavery" was published in 1992 and is the first comprehensive chronicle of the Bahamian people in the Bahamas, and it is the first work of its kind in the Caribbean region. It was written by Canadian author Michael Craton and Bahamian Historian and Author Gail Saunders. A part two of this work was also published in 2000.

"The Migration of Peoples from the Caribbean to the Bahamas" was written by Bahamian Historian and Author Keith L. Tinker and Published in 2011. It focuses on Immigration to the Bahamas by people from other Caribbean countries throughout history.

== Folk ==
Afro-Bahamian Folk literature since the late 18th century were based heavily on the trickster tales that featured many characters, most common was B'Rabby, B'Bouki, B'Spider, B'Elephant, etc. These Folk tales were largely oral until the late 19th century when American researchers started writing them down. These tales are also featured in Bahamian author Patricia Glinton-Meicholas's "An Evening In Guanima: A Treasury of Folktales from the Bahamas".
