= Culture of North America =

The culture of North America refers to the arts and other manifestations of human activities and achievements from the continent of North America. It is shaped by a rich combination of different backgrounds, traditions, and ways of life. It reflects the diversity of its people and the influence of history in forming a unique cultural identity. Its strong global influence also makes it an important culture to study and understand. This culture is expressed in different aspects of society, showing how diversity and historical development have contributed to the way of life in North America today.

== History ==
Indigenous North American societies emphasized egalitarianism, with European cultures arriving in North America after 1492 from the south (through Spanish exploration and conquest) and the east. The integration of cultures throughout North America has brought them closer over centuries, but has also led to fears over excessive Americanization.

== Music ==
- American music
- Antiguan and Barbudan music
- Bahamian music
- Barbadian music
- Belizean music
- Canadian music
- Costa Rican music
- Cuban music
- Dominican music (Dominica)
- Dominican music (Dominican Republic)
- Grenadian music
- Guatemalan music
- Haitian music
- Honduran music
- Jamaican music
- Mexican music
- Nicaraguan music
- Panamanian music
- Puerto Rican music
- Saint Kittitian and Nevisian music
- Saint Lucian music
- Saint Vincentian and Grenadinian music
- Salvadoran music
- Trinidadian and Tobagonian music

== Mythology and folklore ==
- American folklore
  - Hawaiian folklore
  - Hawaiian mythology
  - Mexican-American folklore
  - African-American folklore
- American mythology
- Canadian folklore
  - Acadian folklore
- Canadian mythology (category)
- Honduran folklore
- Indigenous mythologies of the Americas
- Mexican folktales

== Languages ==
North American English (see Anglo-America):

- American English
- Canadian English

Indigenous languages:

- Cree
- Ojibwe

French:

- American French
  - Frenchville French
  - Louisiana French
  - Missouri French
  - Muskrat French
  - New England French (a variety of Canadian French spoken in New England)
- Canadian French
  - Quebec French
  - Ontario French
  - Métis French
    - Michif
  - Acadian French
    - Chiac
  - Brayon
  - Newfoundland French
- Haitian French
- Saint-Barthélemy French

Spanish:

- American Spanish
  - Isleño Spanish
  - New-Mexican Spanish
- Canarian Spanish
- Caribbean Spanish
- Central-American Spanish
- Costa Rican Spanish
- Cuban Spanish
- Dominican Spanish
- Guatemalan Spanish
- Mexican Spanish
- Puerto-Rican Spanish

Creole languages:

- Antillean Creole
- Haitian Creole
- Jamaican Creole
- Louisiana Creole
- Papiamento
- Spanglish

== Literature ==
- American literature
- Antiguan and Barbudan literature
- Bahamian literature
- Barbadian literature
- Belizean literature
- Canadian literature
- Costa Rican literature
- Cuban literature
- Dominican literature (Dominica)
- Dominican literature (Dominican Republic)
- Grenadian literature
- Guatemalan literature
- Haitian literature
- Honduran literature
- Jamaican literature
- Mexican literature
- Nicaraguan literature
- Panamanian literature
- Puerto Rican literature
- Saint Kittitian and Nevisian literature
- Saint Lucian literature
- Saint Vincentian and Grenadinian literature
- Salvadoran literature
- Trinidadian and Tobagonian literature

== Religion ==
Religious Belief in North America, according to 2010-2012 data

Religion in North America is dominated by various branches of Christianity and spans the period of Native American dwelling, European settlement, and the present day. Religion has been a major influence on art, culture, philosophy and law of the continent.

== Clothing ==
- American clothing (Western wear)
- American fashion
- Native American fashion

== Cuisine ==
- American cuisine
- Antiguan and Barbudan cuisine
- Bahamian cuisine
- Barbadian cuisine
- Belizean cuisine
- Canadian cuisine
- Costa Rican cuisine
- Cuban cuisine
- Dominican cuisine (Dominica)
- Dominican cuisine (Dominican Republic)
- Grenadian cuisine
- Guatemalan cuisine
- Haitian cuisine
- Honduran cuisine
- Jamaican cuisine
- Mexican cuisine
- Nicaraguan cuisine
- Panamanian cuisine
- Puerto Rican cuisine
- Saint Kittitian and Nevisian cuisine
- Saint Lucian cuisine
- Saint Vincentian and Grenadinian cuisine
- Salvadoran cuisine
- Trinidadian and Tobagonian cuisine

== Sports ==
The North American continent is the birthplace of several organized sports, such as basketball, charrería/rodeo, gridiron football, ice hockey, jaripeo/bull riding, lacrosse, ollamaliztl (ancient Mesoamerican sport), mixed martial arts (MMA), padel, pickleball, racquetball, ultimate, and volleyball. The modern versions of baseball and softball, skateboarding, snowboarding, stock car racing, and surfing also developed in North America.

== Symbols ==
- Symbols of the United States
- Symbols of Canada
  - Symbols of Alberta
  - Symbols of British Columbia
  - Symbols of Manitoba
  - Symbols of Newfoundland and Labrador
  - Symbols of the Northwest Territories
  - Symbols of Nova Scotia
  - Symbols of Nunavut
  - Symbols of Ontario
  - Symbols of Prince Edward Island
  - Symbols of Quebec
  - Symbols of Saskatchewan
  - Symbols of Yukon
- Symbols of Mexico

== See also ==
- Culture of Africa
- Culture of Asia
- Culture of Europe
- Culture of Oceania
- Culture of South America
