= Culture of the Republic of the Congo =

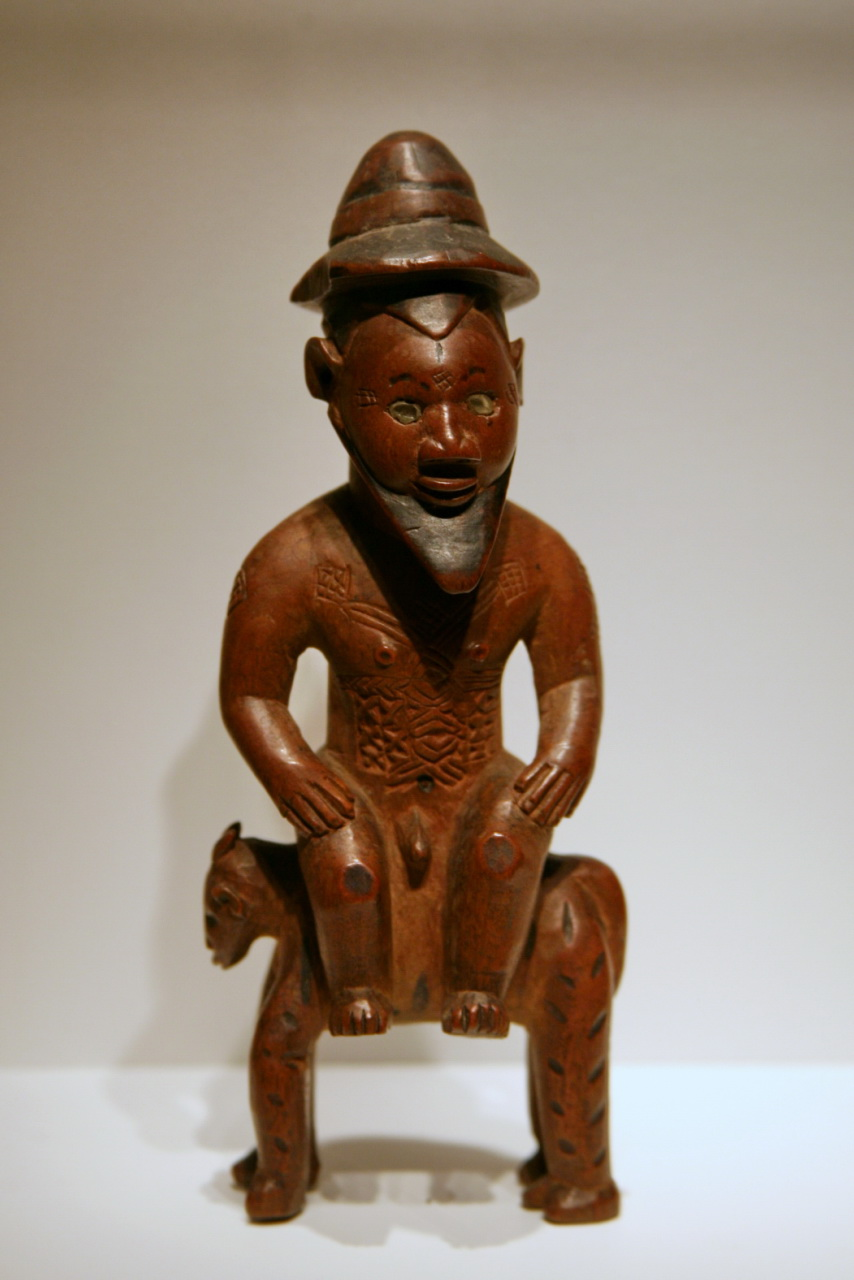
Male figure, Bembe peoples, Republic of the Congo, Early 20th century, Wood, glass

The culture of the Republic of the Congo is rich and diverse. In 2015, it had a mixed population of about 4.5 million people and many languages and customs.

Half of the Congolese people follow traditional beliefs, with 15 principal Bantu groups and more than 70 subgroups. The other half are 35% Roman Catholic, 15% other Christian and 2% Muslim. The region was dominated by Bantu-speaking tribes, who built trade links leading into the Congo River basin. Congo-Brazzaville was formerly part of the French colony of Equatorial Africa.

== Language and writings ==
The official language of the Republic of Congo is French. French is spoken by 56% of the Congolese population (78% of the population over 10 years), the second highest percentage of Africa in 2010, behind that of Gabon. About 88% of Brazzavillans over 15 years of age say they have an easy expression in French. The Republic of Congo has several well-known writers in Africa and the French-speaking world: Alain Mabanckou, Jean-Baptiste Tati Loutard, Jeannette Balou Tchichelle, Henri Lopes, Lassy Mbouity and Tchicaya U Tam'si.

Several artistic genres, such as Congolese cinema, struggle to make their breakthrough. After a promising start in the 1970s, the turbulent political environment and the closing of cinemas made production difficult. The country produces no feature films a year, and filmmakers broadcast their productions directly on video. In the end, in Congo-Brazzaville, culture remained until then the poor relation of successive governments' investments.

== Geography ==
Congo is located in the central-western part of sub-Saharan Africa, along the Equator. To the south and east of it is the Democratic Republic of the Congo. It is bounded by Gabon to the west, Cameroon and the Central African Republic to the north, and Cabinda (Angola) to the southwest. It has a coast on the Atlantic Ocean.

== Education ==
In the Republic of Congo, public spending on education was lower in 2002-05 than in 1991. Public education is theoretically free and mandatory for children under 16, but parents face a series of expenses in practice. The net first-degree enrollment rate was 44% in 2005, much less than 79% in 1991. The country has universities. Education between the ages of six and sixteen is mandatory. Students who complete six years of primary and seven years of high school obtain a bachelor's degree. At the university, students can obtain a degree in three years.

== Health Status ==
Medical facilities are severely limited, and medical materials are in short supply. Supply of prescription or over-the-counter drugs in local stores or pharmacies is also generally unavailable. Payment for any medical services is expected in cash in the Congo before treatment.

== Food ==
Congolese cuisine is a blend of French, Asian and Arabic influences into more starchy, traditional African fare.

The Congolese diet features a diverse array of fruits. Among the most favored is the nsafu, indigenous to Africa and derived from the Dacryodes edulis tree. This fruit can be consumed in various forms, including raw, boiled, roasted, or dried. Additionally, palm fruit plays a significant role in producing palm oil and palm wine; it is also prepared by boiling. Other fruits commonly found in the diet include mvuuta, lemons, plums (mungyengye), pineapple, cola nut, and banana (dinkondo). Notably, bananas exhibit a range of colors and sizes, with some varieties being wild and others being introduced to the region. The Congolese cuisine also incorporates a variety of nuts, beans, peas, pumpkin, cabbage, potatoes, mushrooms, and spices, all of which come in different sizes and colors and can be prepared in numerous ways. Termites are another unique diet component; they are collected in flight and from the ground, with their nests in baskets. Termites are typically enjoyed alongside boiled manioc and beans, and the earth and clay from their nests are particularly sought after by children and pregnant women. Furthermore, the diet includes domestic animals, fish, and birds. Spices, particularly pepper, hold significant importance in Congolese cooking. One of the most popular varieties is nungu or ndungu, but there are several types, including Capsicum frutescens, known as pili-pili. The national dish, saka saka, features ground cassava leaves combined with smoked fish, peanut butter, and palm oil, typically served alongside fufu or plantains. Another traditional dish, yuuma, is made from roasted peanuts ground into a paste and served with boiled bananas, cassava (manioc starch), and palm oil, seasoned with salt, pepper, and optional meat. In regions where cassava is scarce, beans may substitute for cassava, accompanied by potato leaves in the stew. Moboke is another well-regarded dish, consisting of a fish stew enriched with green vegetables, often paired with fufu made from cassava or plantains. Moambe, a beloved roasted chicken dish, is prepared in a rich sauce derived from palm nuts. Additionally, moukalou, a fish broth complemented by coconut juice and peanut butter, is enjoyed by many. Other popular dishes include madesu and fumbwa. The preferred beverages in the region are beer and various fruit juices, particularly pineapple and mango.
