= Georgia Boy Choir =

American boys' choir in Atlanta

The Georgia Boy Choir, founded in 2009 by David White, is an American boys' choir based in Atlanta, Georgia. In the fall of 2010, it was announced that the Georgia Boy Choir was named the Ensemble-In-Residence at Peachtree Road United Methodist Church.

== History ==
The Georgia Boy Choir was founded in 2009 by David White, former director of the Atlanta Boy Choir and the Florida's Singing Sons Boy choir.

The Georgia Boy Choir operates on a five-tier system of musical education for boys as young as five years old through high school. The choirs range from the youngest members in the Apprentice Choir to the oldest members of the Young Men's Ensemble.

== Performances ==
The choir's inaugural tour was to China, where it performed at venues like Beijing University and the Chengdu Concert Hall. Since then, the choir has traveled to many countries, such as England, Denmark, Norway, Sweden, Estonia, Finland, Spain, Portugal, Scotland, Ireland, France, Belgium, Italy, Iceland, Germany, Austria, Czechia, Switzerland, Liechtenstein, China for the second time, and many domestic tours. As of 2027, the Georgia Boy choir is going on the Spain and Morocco tour. The choir host large performances on many occasions, such as Christmas with The Georgia Boy Choir and The Georgia Boy Choir International Festival. They also often sing on Sundays at Peachtree Road United Methodist Church, and regularly carol around the Metro Atlanta Area during the Christmas season.
