= Cultural variation =

Intercultural diversity in social practices

Cultural variation refers to the rich diversity in social practices that different cultures exhibit around the world. Cuisine and art all change from one culture to the next, but so do gender roles, economic systems, and social hierarchy among any number of other humanly organised behaviours. Cultural variation can be studied across cultures (for example, a cross-cultural study of ritual in Indonesia and Brazil) or across generations (for example, a comparison of Generation X and Generation Y) and is often a subject studied by anthropologists, sociologists and cultural theorists with subspecialties in the fields of economic anthropology, ethnomusicology, health sociology etc. In recent years, cultural variation has become a rich source of study in neuroanthropology, cultural neuroscience, and social neuroscience.

== See also ==
- Cultural diversity
- Cultural anthropology
- Cultural studies
- Culture theory
- Neuroanthropology
