= Cultural neuroscience =

Field of research

Cultural neuroscience is a field of research that focuses on the interrelation between a human's cultural environment and neurobiological systems. The field particularly incorporates ideas and perspectives from related domains like anthropology, psychology, and cognitive neuroscience to study sociocultural influences on human behaviors. Such impacts on behavior are often measured using various neuroimaging methods, through which cross-cultural variability in neural activity can be examined.

Cultural neuroscientists study cultural variation in mental, neural and genomic processes as a means of articulating the bidirectional relationship of these processes and their emergent properties using a variety of methods. Researchers in cultural neuroscience are motivated by two fundamentally intriguing, yet still unanswered, questions on the origins of human nature and human diversity: how do cultural traits (e.g., values, beliefs, practices) shape neurobiology (e.g., genetic and neural processes) and behavior, and how do neurobiological mechanisms (e.g., genetic and neural processes) facilitate the emergence and transmission of cultural traits?

The idea that complex behavior results from the dynamic interaction of genes and cultural environment is not new; however, cultural neuroscience represents a novel empirical approach to demonstrating bidirectional interactions between culture and biology by integrating theory and methods from cultural psychology, neuroscience and neurogenetics.

Similar to other interdisciplinary fields such as social neuroscience, cognitive neuroscience, affective neuroscience, and neuroanthropology, cultural neuroscience aims to explain a given mental phenomenon in terms of a synergistic product of mental, neural and genetic events. In particular, cultural neuroscience shares common research goals with social neuroscientists examining how neurobiological mechanisms (e.g., mirror neurons), facilitate cultural transmission, (e.g., imitative learning) and neuroanthropologists examining how embedded culture, as captured by cross-species comparison and ethnography, is related to brain function. Cultural neuroscience also shares intellectual goals with critical neuroscience, a field of inquiry that scrutinizes the social, cultural, economic and political contexts and assumptions that underlie behavioral and brain science research as it is practiced today.

Research in cultural neuroscience has practical relevance to transcultural psychiatry, business and technology as well as broader implications for global public policy issues such as population health disparities, bioethics, globalization, immigration, interethnic ideology and international relations.

== Previous cross-cultural research ==
While the field of cultural neuroscience may still be growing, there are studies conducted by various researchers that have looked at cross-cultural similarities and differences in human attention, visual perception, and the understanding of others and the self. Previous behavioral research has focused on the cultural differences in perception, particularly between people from East Asian and Western regions. The results from these studies have suggested that East Asians focus their visual perception more on the backgrounds and contexts of their environment, while Westerners focus on individual stimuli/objects. To further explore these findings, more research was done to specifically look at the neurological similarities and differences in attention and visual perception of people in East Asian and Western cultures.

Results from a 2008 study by Hedden et al. support the previous findings by showing how East Asians require more attention than Americans for individually processing objects. Brain regions more focused on attention, such as areas in the parietal and prefrontal lobes as well as the inferior parietal lobule and precentral gyrus, were found to be highly active in East Asian subjects compared to American subjects, during individual object processing. A visual perception study conducted by Gutchess et al. in 2006, also found neurological differences between Chinese and American subjects as they completed tasks of encoding images of individual objects, backgrounds, and objects with backgrounds. The fMRI results from the study presented that during visual processing of objects, there was greater neural activity in the middle temporal gyri, right superior temporal gyri, and superior parietal lobules of the American subjects than that of the Chinese subjects. Such results indicate a focus on object processing among Westerners compared to East Asians. Insignificant differences in neural activity between subjects were found during the visual processing of images with backgrounds.

People from East Asian and Western cultures were also studied to learn more about cross-cultural differences in understanding both the self and other people. Findings from a 1991 study by Markus and Kitayama presented that people from Eastern cultures view the self in relation to others in their community, while people from Western cultures have a more independent perspective of the self. A 2007 fMRI study observed differences in activity in the ventromedial prefrontal cortex, a brain region highly active during self perception, when Western and Chinese subjects were thinking about themselves versus when they were thinking about their mothers. The results interestingly showed that there was still activity in the ventral medial prefrontal cortices of Chinese subjects even when they thought about their mothers, while activity was only detected in American subjects when they thought about themselves.

A different study conducted by psychologist Joan Chiao found that due to cultural differences, East Asians are more likely to have depression than Americans. She found that East Asians are more likely to carry the short allele of the serotonin transporter gene (STG) which leads to depression while Americans carry the long allele which doesn't lead to depression. Yet due to difference in cultural structure they found that collectivist societies are more likely to find happiness than individual societies.

Another study done by psychologists Nalini Ambady and Jonathan Freeman showed a difference in brain activity between Japanese and Americans when shown different body posture. They found that the reward circuitry in the limbic system would light up when Japanese participants saw submissive body posture while the reward circuitry would activate when Americans saw dominant body posture.

== Culture differences in visual stimuli ==
Cultural differences exist in the ventral visual cortex and many studies have shown this. In a study conducted in 2005 they found that East Asians were more likely to keep their eyes focused on background scenes than westerners who would instead focus more on the central object such as a giraffe in a savanna. In a similar 2006 study it showed that in congruence to the difference in society structure westerners showed more activation in object processing regions, including the bilateral middle temporal gyrus, left superior parietal gyrus, and right superior temporal gyrus, although no activation differences were observed in context-processing regions such as the hippocampus. However, there has been some research contradicting cultural bias in the oculomotor control such as one conducted in 2007 by Rayner, Li, Williams, Cave, and Well who failed to find evidence that East Asians focus more on context although they did find evidence that they are more likely to focus less on central objects. In a different study they focused more on difference in attention towards faces. They proved that Americans focus more broadly on the entire face such as both the eyes and mouth while Asians focus more on a single part, such as the mouth. The authors point out that this happens due to gaze avoidance in east Asian culture as a way of politeness. In 2008, another study focusing on context showed that East Asians were more likely to include greater details and background when taking photographs of a model when they were free to set the zoom function of the camera as they saw fit. In 2003, a group of researchers used the Frame-Line Test and asked the participants to draw a line of either exactly the same length as the one showed or one that was proportional in size. Americans were more accurate in the absolute task, suggesting better memory for the exact or absolute size of the focal object, but East Asians were more accurate in the relative (proportional) task, suggesting better memory for contextual relationships. In a later study conducted by the same group they found a pattern within the cultures when processing emotions. East Asians were less likely to know the difference between fear and disgust than Americans when sampling faces.

Many studies conducted proves that constant repetition in a certain skill has an effect on brain activity. For example, in a 2000 study they showed that taxi drivers in London showed larger gray matter in the posterior hippocampi than the average civilian. A different study in 2004 showed that those who know how to juggle have an increase in volume of the cortical tissue in the bilateral midtemporal area and left posterior intraparietal sulcus.

The findings from many neuroimaging studies reflect the behavioral patterns observed in previous anthropological and cultural research. Such comparisons that were made between particular behavioral and neural activity across different cultures, have already provided the scientific community with more insight into the cultural influences on human behavior.

== See also ==
- Cross-cultural psychiatry
- Cross-cultural psychology
- Epigenesis (biology)
- Evolutionary anthropology
- Evolutionary neuroscience
- Evolutionary psychology
- Gene-environment interaction
- Gut–brain axis
- Imaging genetics
- Niche construction
- Population genetics
- Sociobiology
