= Neuroanthropology =

Branch of study

Neuroanthropology is the study of the relationship between culture and the brain. (Note: Daniel Lende and Greg Downey recount the origins of a definition of "neuroanthropology": they saw "[...] the potential for a biocultural synthesis that took culture and ethnography more seriously [and] the potential for neuroscience and psychology to strengthen sociocultural theory. [...] The term ['neuroanthropology'] captured the proposed area of synthesis in direct and pragmatic fashion [...].") This field of study emerged from a 2008 conference of the American Anthropological Association. It is based on the premise that lived experience leaves identifiable patterns in brain structure, which then feed back into cultural expression. The exact mechanisms are so far ill defined and remain speculative.

== Overview ==
Neuroanthropology explores how the brain gives rise to culture, how culture influences brain development, structure and function, and the pathways followed by the co-evolution of brain and culture. Moreover, neuroanthropologists consider how new findings in the brain sciences help us understand the interactive effects of culture and biology on human development and behavior. In one way or another, neuroanthropologists ground their research and explanations in how the human brain develops, how it is structured and how it functions within the genetic and cultural limits of its biology (see Biogenetic structuralism and related website).

"Neuroanthropology" is a broad term, intended to embrace all dimensions of human neural activity, including emotion, perception, cognition, motor control, skill acquisition, and a range of other issues. Interests include the evolution of the hominid brain, cultural development and the brain, the biochemistry of the brain and alternative states of consciousness, human universals, how culture influences perception, how the brain structures experience, and so forth. In comparison to previous ways of doing psychological or cognitive anthropology, it remains open and heterogeneous, recognizing that not all brain systems function in the same way, so culture will not take hold of them in identical fashion.

=== Anthropology and neuroscience ===
Cultural neuroscience is another area that focuses on society's impact on the brain, but with a different focus. For example, studies in cultural neuroscience focus on differences in brain development across cultures using methods from cross-cultural psychology, whereas neuroanthropology revolves around regions in the brain that correspond to differences in cultural upbringing.

Previously within the field of cultural neuroscience, anthropological methods such as ethnographic fieldwork have not been viewed as crucial for obtaining results to their hypotheses. Neuroanthropology, on the other hand, aims to focus largely on incorporating ideas and practices from both anthropology and neuroscience to better understand how culture impacts brain development. Specifically, neuroanthropology studies how differences in culture may influence neuronal signals and development pertaining to language, music, mental calculations, self-knowledge, and self-awareness. A major finding concludes that experience determines pre-existing patterns of neural activity.

== History ==
Neuroanthropology got revived as a field of study during a 2008 American Anthropological Association conference session. The session was titled "The Encultured Brain: Neuroanthropology and Interdisciplinary Engagement". In the past, neuroscience and anthropology existed as two separate disciplines that worked together only when necessary. During the 2008 AAA conference session, the need for a study intersecting both fields of study was brought forth with claims that culture directly impacts brain development.

The lecture given by Daniel Lende at the 2008 AAA conference session specifically revolved around the benefits the field of anthropology would gain if they incorporated neuroscience into the field. As Lende stated, studying the brain would give us some answers as to why individuals behave the way they do. Essentially, Lende argues that neuroanthropology would allow anthropologists to tackle questions that were previously unable to be answered. These were questions that were first proposed by Franz Boas and Bronislaw Malinowski as they tried to study what motivates individuals and what becomes a desire. In short, according to Lende, combining anthropology and neuroscience into neuroanthropology would enable individuals to study why individuals do the things they do.

== Building culture (enculturation) ==
There are two forms of enculturation: culture built by the brain and cultures effect on the brain. The former deals with the neural and cognitive mechanisms of building culture while the latter relates how the culture alters the brain structure.

=== Culture built by the brain ===
Humans impart significant meaning to things in order to create culture because of the prefrontal cortex. The prefrontal cortex does this by taking in information and categorizing it to then relate it to other pieces of information. Anthropologically, culture can be defined as the understanding of symbolic meaning shared between people. This mutual understanding is built individually among people and starts out rather simple. It begins with a small number of cultural elements with relatively little meaning and isolated applications. These elements then grow in complexity to include a greater number of them with greater hierarchical depth and more linkages to other objects or events. This process is called abductive inference. When individuals interact with objects their individual abduction builds information. Groups of people then take the information to build a shared context to understand one another. By growing a shared context people form more logical inferences as to the best meaning for any particular observation or object.

=== Culture's effect on the brain ===
The most important discovery is that the entire brain, including the prefrontal cortex, reacts to cultural experiences. Culture builds patterns of neuronal activity so as to alter the structure of the brain.

=== Research ===
Multiple studies concerning neuroanthropology have been conducted. These studies occur in a laboratory environment as well as the ethnographic field. Laboratory studies are concerned with figuring out the "cause-effect relationship between cognitive function, brain structure, and brain activity." Anthropological studies are concerned with the behaviors that contribute to differences in cognitive function, such as the way colors and languages are perceived.

==== Health ====
Neuroanthropological studies conducted in Brazil show the effects culture has on mental health. Further, this study shows how the variables that contribute to a society's view of normal behaviors directly influence the degree to which an individual feels happy. Levels of serotonin in the brains of the individuals being studied show a correlation between environmental factors and brain health. Similar studies have been conducted on United States war veterans and posttraumatic stress disorder (PTSD).

=== Summary ===
In summary, the prefrontal cortex takes objects and events from specific areas of the brain and forms connections between them. This forms the building blocks of culture. By building the connections, the areas of the brain, including the prefrontal cortex, can create new ideas and modify them as a result of cultural experiences.

== fMRI analysis ==
Western and East Asian cultures differ in their norms and practices such that they likely alter the brain's perception. Western culture tends to stress individualism and independent attainment, while East Asian culture focuses on collectivism and relationships. The result of the different societies is two unique methods of thinking. In addition to affecting cognition, the two cultures also alter one's visual perception of their environment. More specifically, the norms and practices of Western culture isolate objects from their environmental context to analytically think about the individual item. This differs from the norms and practice of East Asian culture, which involve the relationship or interdependence between an object and its environmental context. As a result of this culture, East Asians would likely focus on the interdependent nature of an object and its surroundings while Westerners would tend to center their attention on the object and how it relates to them. To summarise, East Asians would focus on the interrelatedness between a stimulus and its context, but Westerners would focus on the independence of the object and its relationship to themselves.

Many studies have found this pattern to be true and one of the simplest experiments is the framed-line test. The results of it show that Americans pay attention to an object independent of its environment, while Japanese focus attention on the environment and interrelated objects. Hedden et al. used a modified framed-line test in conjunction with fMRI to determine if there were any physiological differences in subjects brains as a result of the cultural differences. They found that when Americans were asked to make more relative judgments and when East Asians to make absolute judgments, both stimulated similar areas of the brain. When either cultures' nonpreferred judgment was provoked the result was the same for both groups. "The frontal and parietal lobes, specifically the left inferior parietal lobe and the right precentral gyrus were more stimulated than when culturally preferred judgments were made." Thus, a person's societal culture determines how activated this neural network becomes when making visual perceptions. Plus, the degree of activation depends on how deep one's cultural background is. As a result of the differences between Western and East Asian cultures, different neural patterns are activated in the brain depending on particular environmental circumstances. Clearly, culture affects the activity of the brain's functional perception mechanisms in order to better navigate their particular cultural environment.

== See also ==
- Behavioral neuroscience
- Cultural neuroscience
- Neuroculture
- Neuroplasticity
- Social neuroscience
