= Culture of South America =

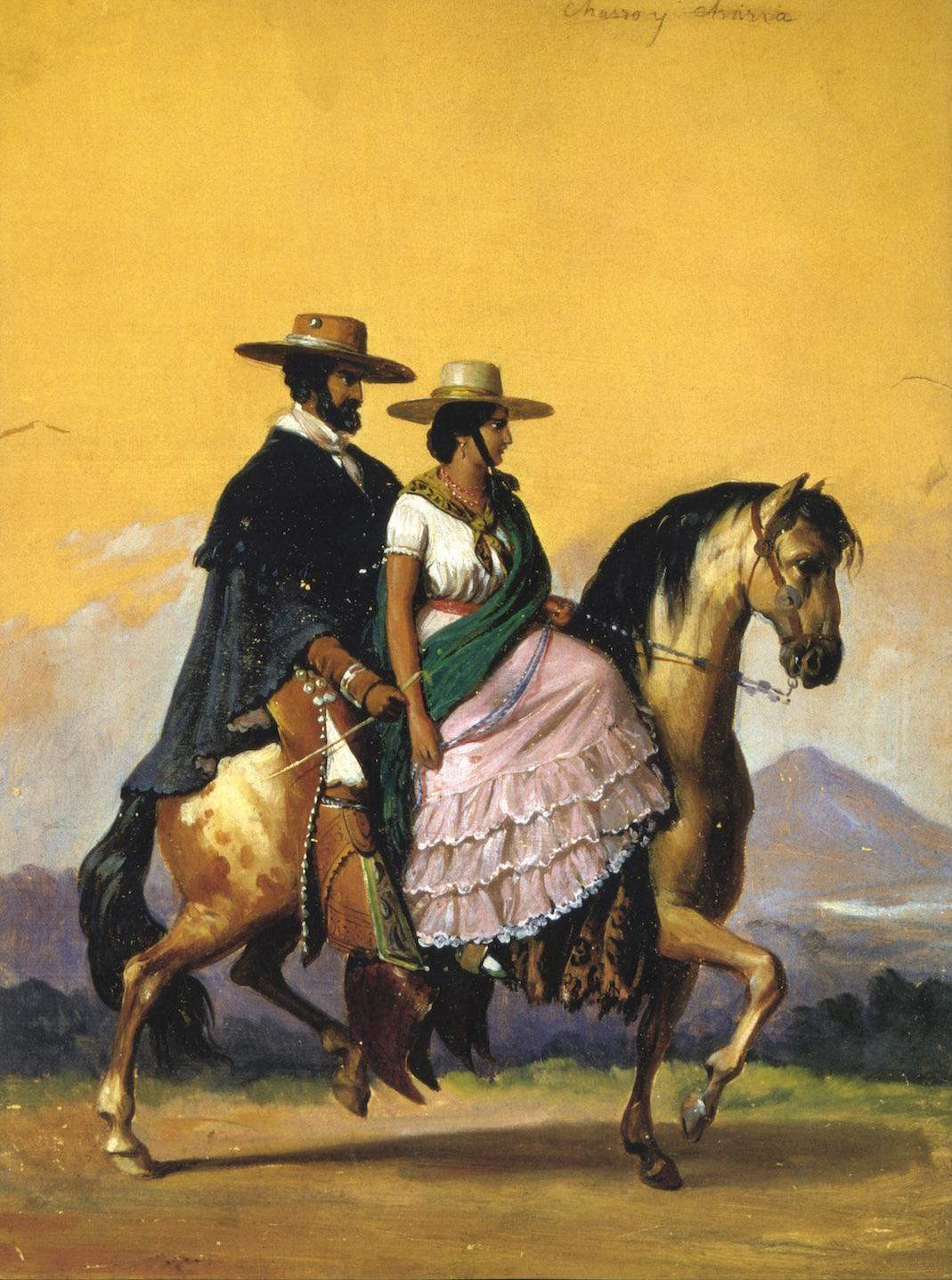
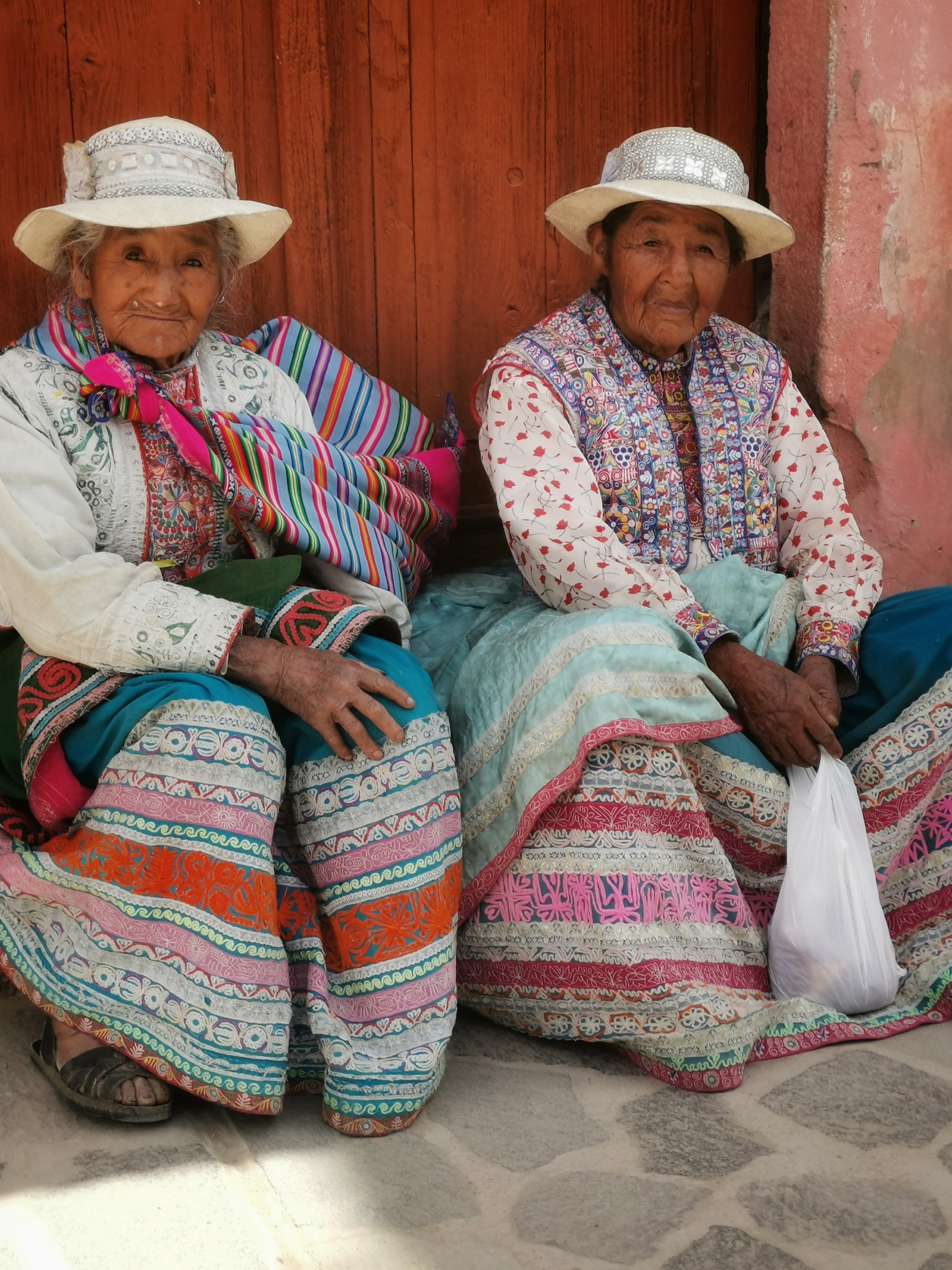
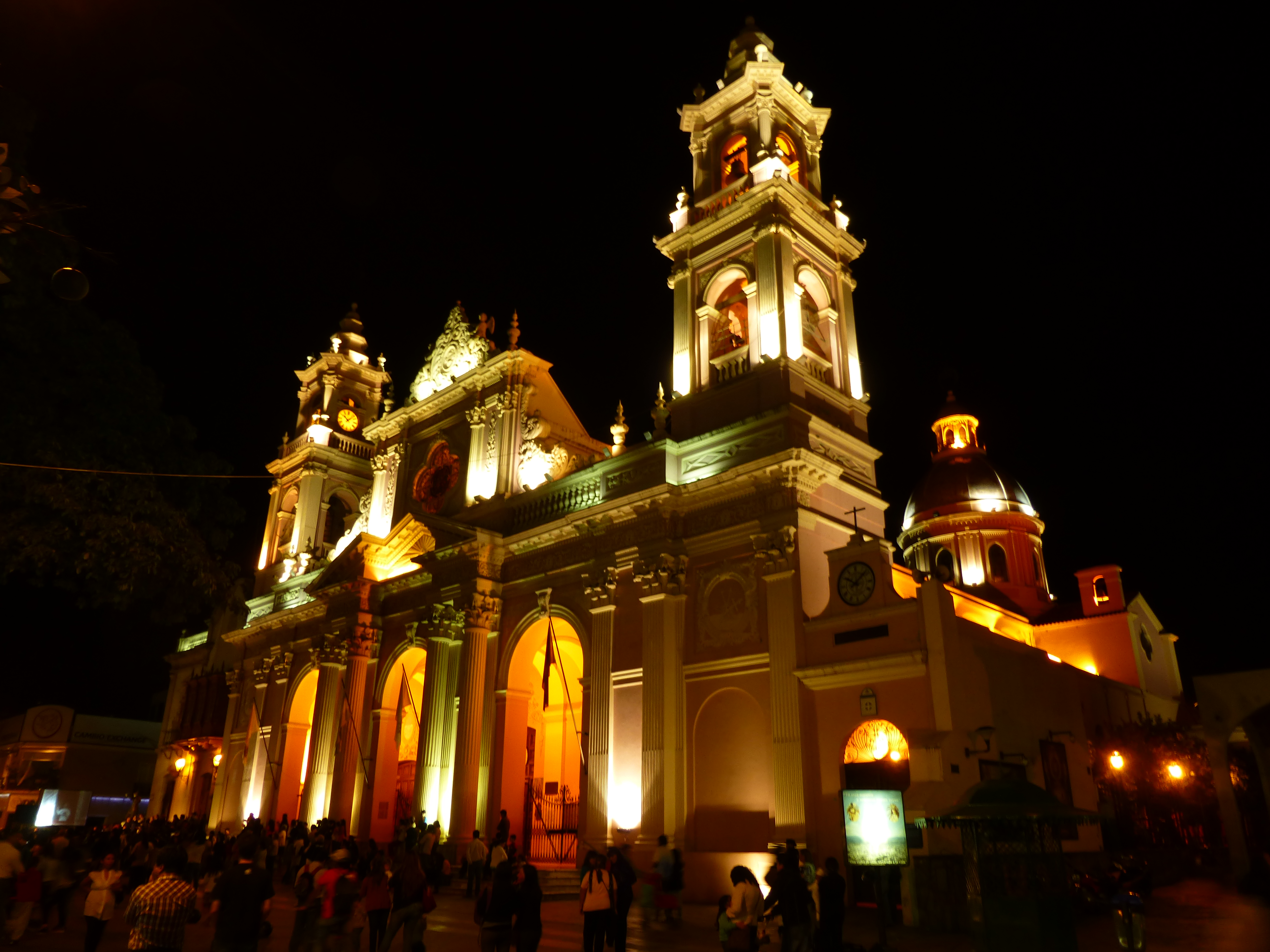
19th century painting of a Mexican charro and charra by Édouard-Henri-Théophile Pingret (top-left), Peruvian women dressed in traditional garments (top-right), Catedral Basílica de Salta in Argentina (bottom).

The culture of South America draws on diverse cultural traditions. These include the native cultures of the peoples that inhabited the continents prior to the arrival of the Europeans; European cultures, brought mainly by the Spanish, the Portuguese and the French; African cultures, whose presence derives from a long history of New World slavery; and the United States, particularly via mass culture such as cinema and TV.

== Religions ==
Roman Catholicism is the dominant religion (over 80%-70% in Hispanic countries, some 65% in Brazil). French Guiana also has a large number of Protestants. Guyana and Suriname are exceptions, with three major religions: Christianity in general, Hinduism, and Islam. In lowland South America, as well as the Andes, animism and shamanism are common, as noted among the Urarina of Peruvian Amazonia.

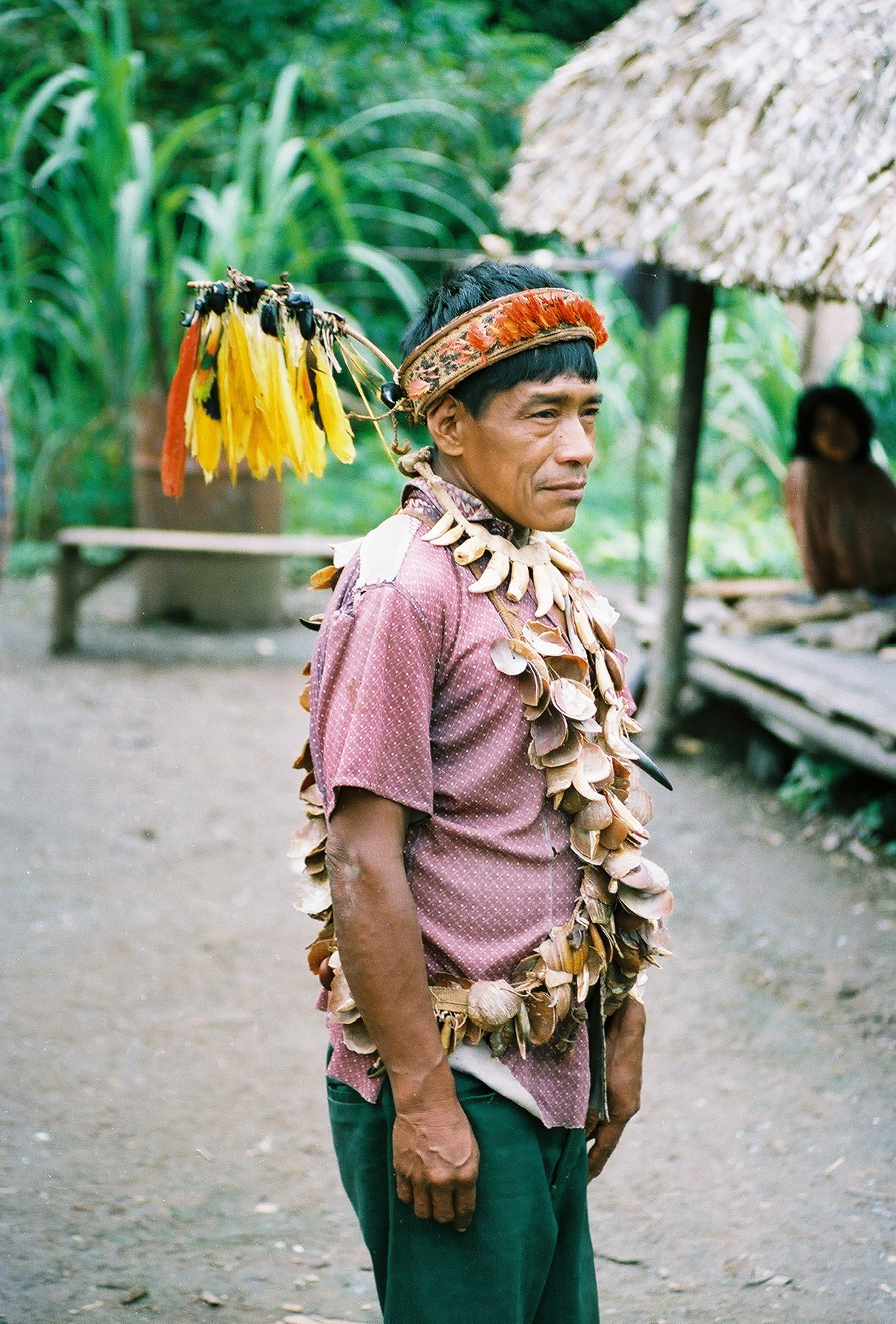
Urarina shaman, 1988

== Languages ==
Spanish and Portuguese are the primary languages of the continent. The majority of South Americans (more than 50%) speak Portuguese. However, most South American countries are Spanish-speaking, and nearly all of the continent's lusophones reside in Brazil. Among other languages used by many South Americans are:

- Aymara in Bolivia and Peru.
- Quechua in Bolivia, Ecuador, and Peru.
- Urarina in Peruvian Amazonia
- Wayuu in Venezuela and Colombia.
- Guaraní in Paraguay.
- English in Guyana.
- Hakka in Suriname.
- Hindi in Guyana and Suriname.
- Dutch and Indonesian in Suriname.
- French in French Guiana
- Italian, German and Welsh in certain pockets across southern South America, such as Brazil, Uruguay, Chile & Argentina.
- Japanese in Peru and Brazil.

== Literature ==
- Argentine literature
- Bolivian literature
- Brazilian literature
- Chilean literature
- Colombian literature
- Ecuadorian literature
- Guyanese literature
- Paraguayan literature
- Peruvian literature
- Surinamese literature
- Uruguayan literature
- Venezuelan literature

== Music ==
South American nations have a rich variety of music. Some of the most famous genres include samba from Brazil, tango from Argentina & Uruguay, and cumbia from Colombia.

- Argentine music
- Bolivian music
- Brazilian music
- Chilean music
- Colombian music
- Ecuadorian music
- Guyanese music
- Paraguayan music
- Peruvian music
- Surinamese music
- Uruguayan music
- Venezuelan music

== Art ==
Beyond the rich tradition of indigenous art, the development of South American visual art owed much to the influence of Spanish, Portuguese and French Baroque painting, which in turn often followed the trends of the Italian Masters. In general, this artistic Eurocentrism began to fade in the early twentieth century, as South Americans began to acknowledge the uniqueness of their condition and started to follow their own path.

- Argentine art
- Bolivian art
- Brazilian art
- Chilean art
- Colombian art
- Ecuadorian art
- Guyanese art
- Paraguayan art
- Peruvian art
- Surinamese art
- Uruguayan art
- Venezuelan art

== Cuisine ==
Because of South America's ethnic mix, South American cuisine takes on European, American Indian, and African influences. The Bahia state (in Brazil) is especially well known for its West African-influenced cuisine. Peru is especially well known for its ethnic mix influences like European, American Indian, African, Chinese, Japanese, and others.

- Argentine cuisine
- Bolivian cuisine
- Brazilian cuisine
- Chilean cuisine
- Colombian cuisine
- Ecuadorian cuisine
- Guyanese cuisine
- Paraguayan cuisine
- Peruvian cuisine
- Surinamese cuisine
- Uruguayan cuisine
- Venezuelan cuisine

== See also ==
- Culture of Africa
- Culture of Asia
- Culture of Europe
- Culture of Latin America
- Culture of North America
- Culture of Oceania
