= Culture of Western Sahara =

The people of Western Sahara speak the Ḥassānīya dialect of Arabic, also spoken in northern Mauritania, and Spanish. They are of mixed Arab, African (including Berber descent), many consider themselves to be Arab. Most claim that they descend from the tribe called Beni Hassan, an Arab tribe, who immigrated to the Western Saharan desert in the 14th century. The Sahrawis are Sunni Muslim and follow the Maliki law school. Their interpretation of Islam has traditionally being quite liberal and adapted to nomad life (i.e. generally functioning without mosques).

The clan- and tribe-based society underwent a massive social upheaval in 1975, when a large portion of the population fled fighting in the country and settled in the refugee camps of Tindouf, Algeria, breaking up families and clans. The Polisario Front, which runs the camps, has attempted to modernize their society, placing a public emphasis on education, the eradication of tribalism and the emancipation of women. The role of women in camps was enhanced by their shouldering of the main responsibility for the camps and government bureaucracy during the war years, as virtually the entire male population was enrolled in the Polisario army.

Education was also assisted by refugee life. While teaching materials are still scarce, the "urbanization" of the refugee camps and the abundance of free time for camp dwellers (after the situation normalized circa 1977) greatly increased the effectiveness of literacy classes. The Polisario Front claims presently that nearly 90% of refugees are literate, the number having been less than 10% in 1975, and several thousands have received university education in foreign countries as part of aid packages (mainly Algeria, Cuba, and Spain).

To date, there have been few thorough studies of the culture due in part to the political situation. Some language and culture studies, mainly by French researchers, have been performed on Sahrawi communities in northern Mauritania.

== Society ==
=== Gender relations ===
In Sahrawi ethnic groups, the concept of beauty is embodied through the practice of fattening. Before marriage, girls intentionally overeat and perform limited physical activity for 40 days in order to be attractive for their soon-to-be husbands. Women will repeat this process if they want to gain weight after marriage. It is believed that traditional clothing of these ethnic groups require a heavier body in order to be attractive.

== Dress ==
Clothing worn by the Sahrawis include the daraa robe. Women wear the melhfa headscarf.

== Cuisine ==
Daily bread ritual

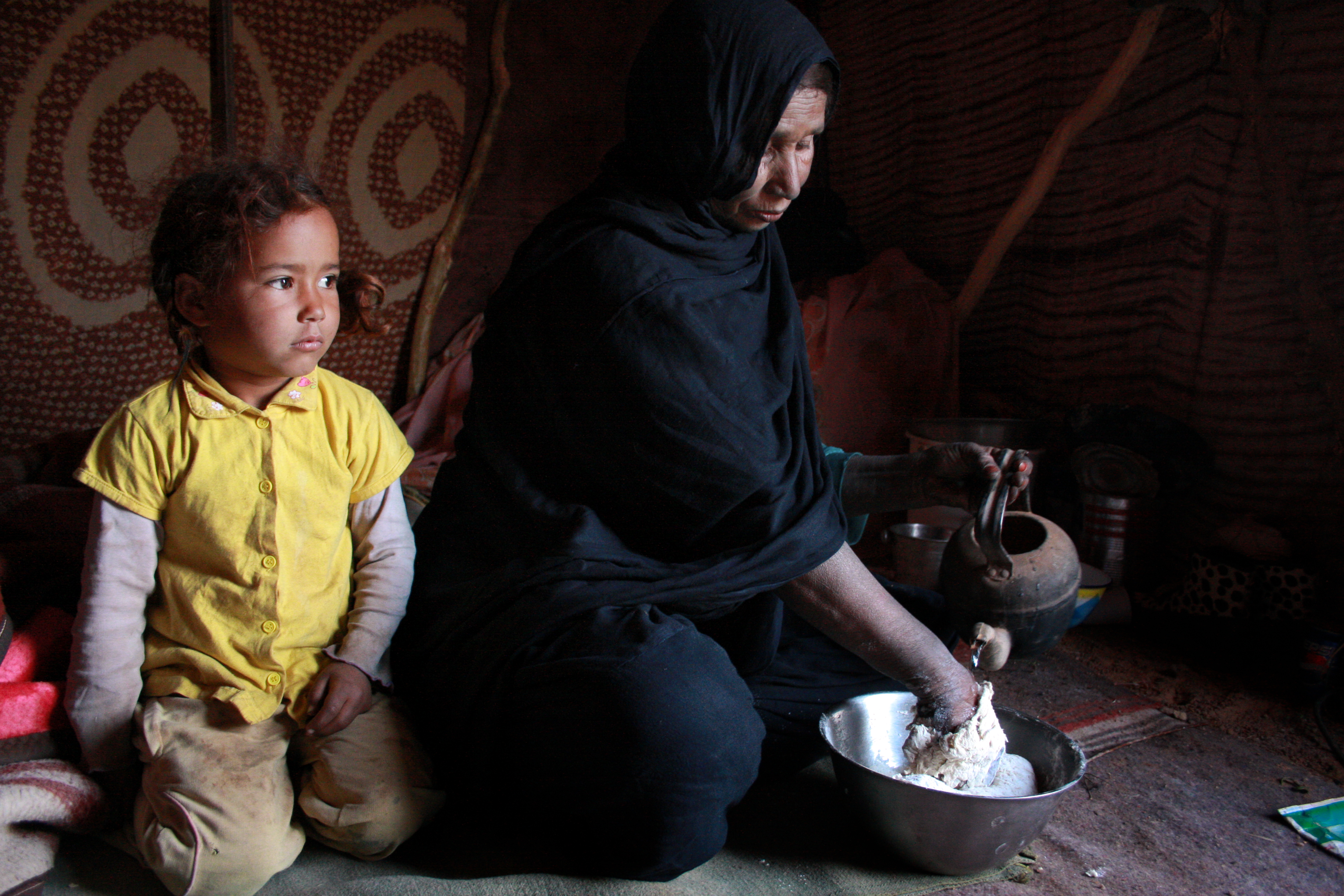

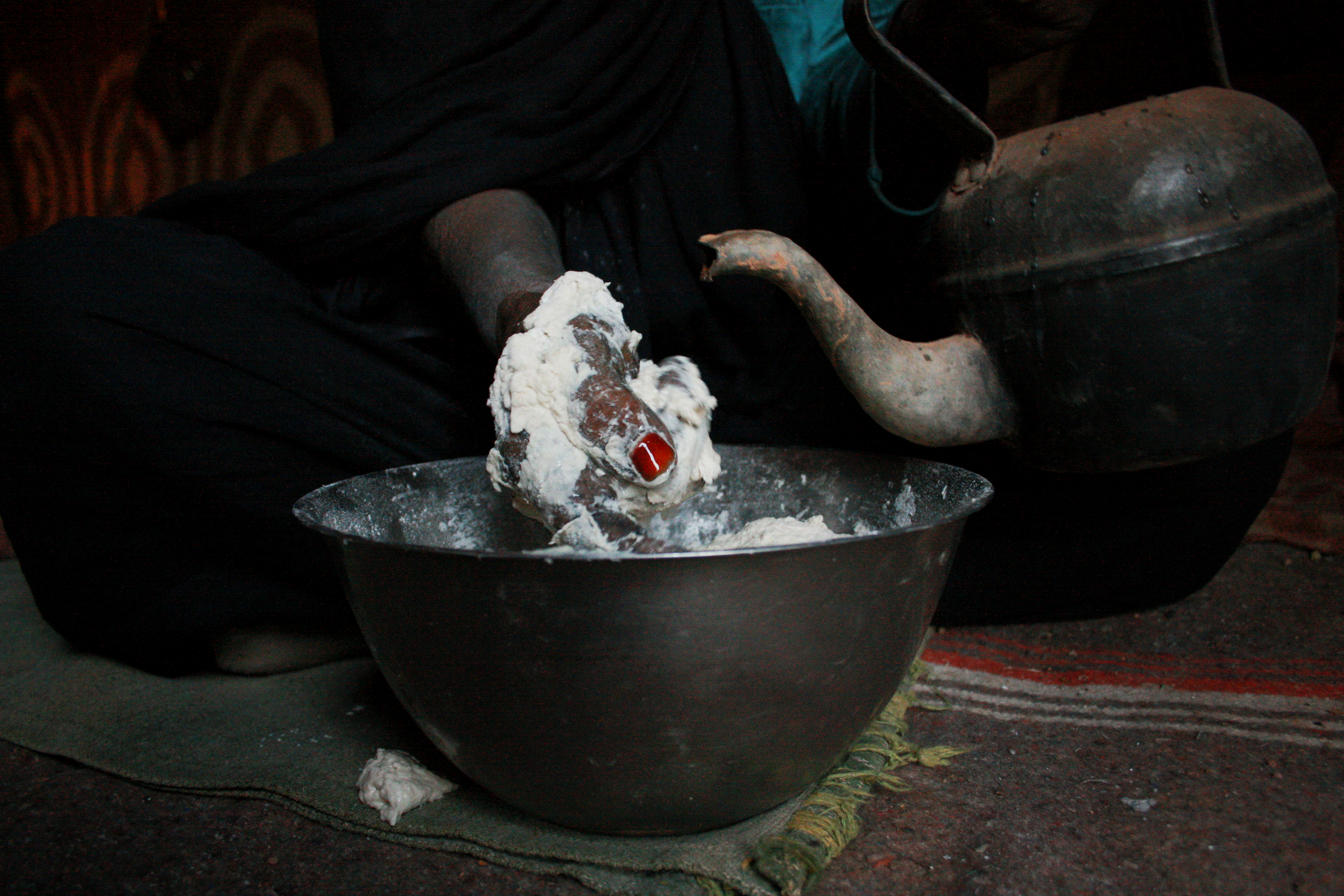

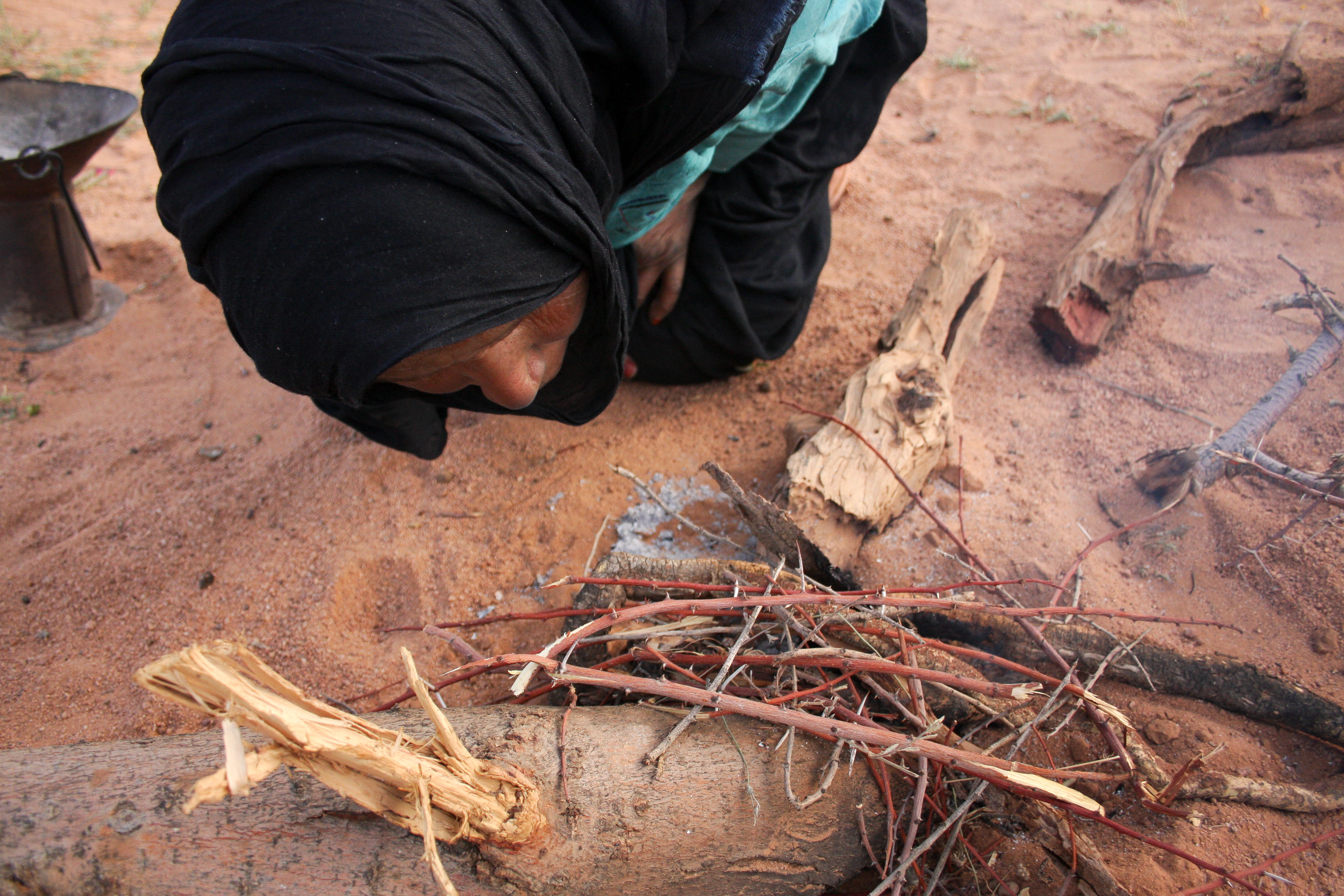

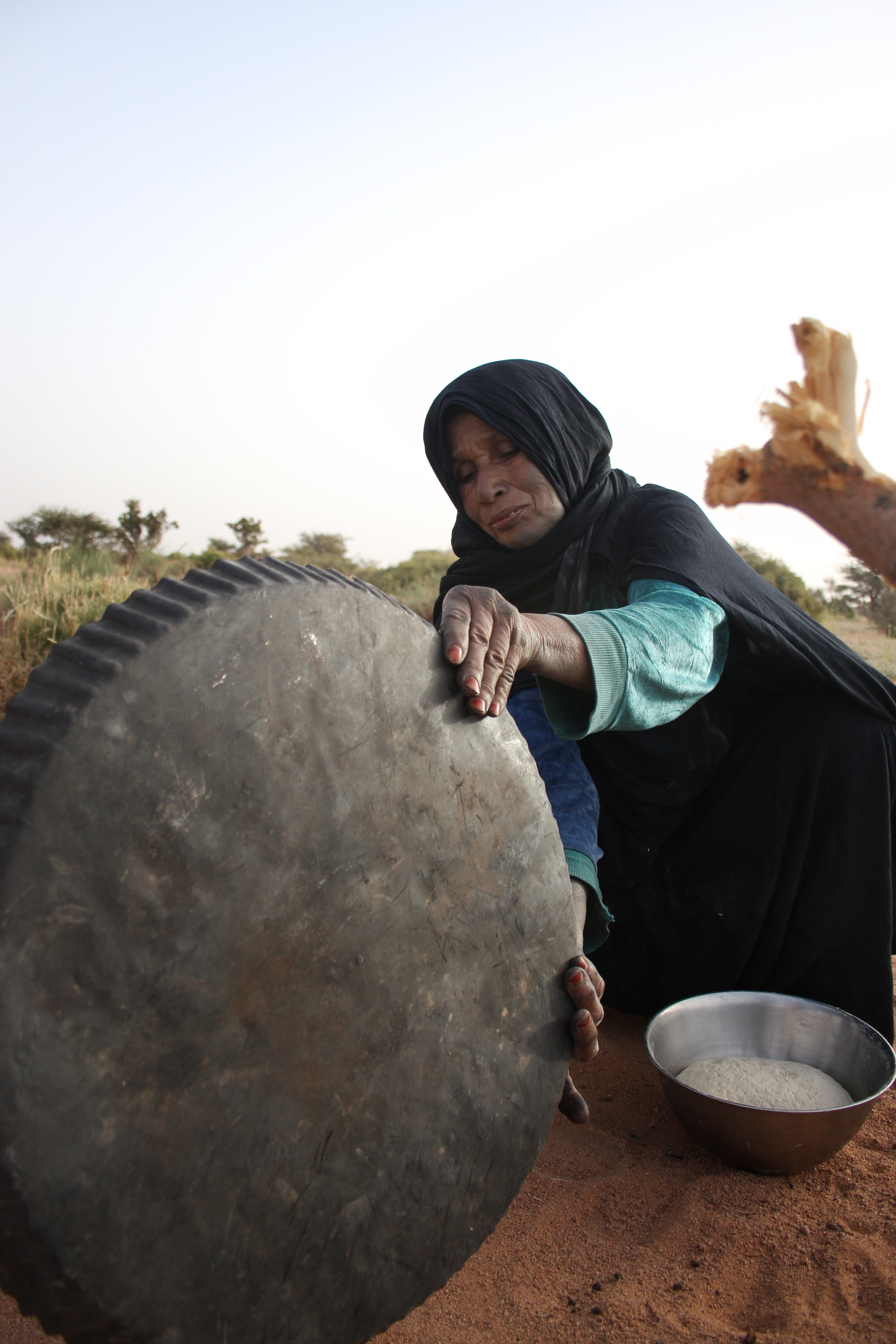

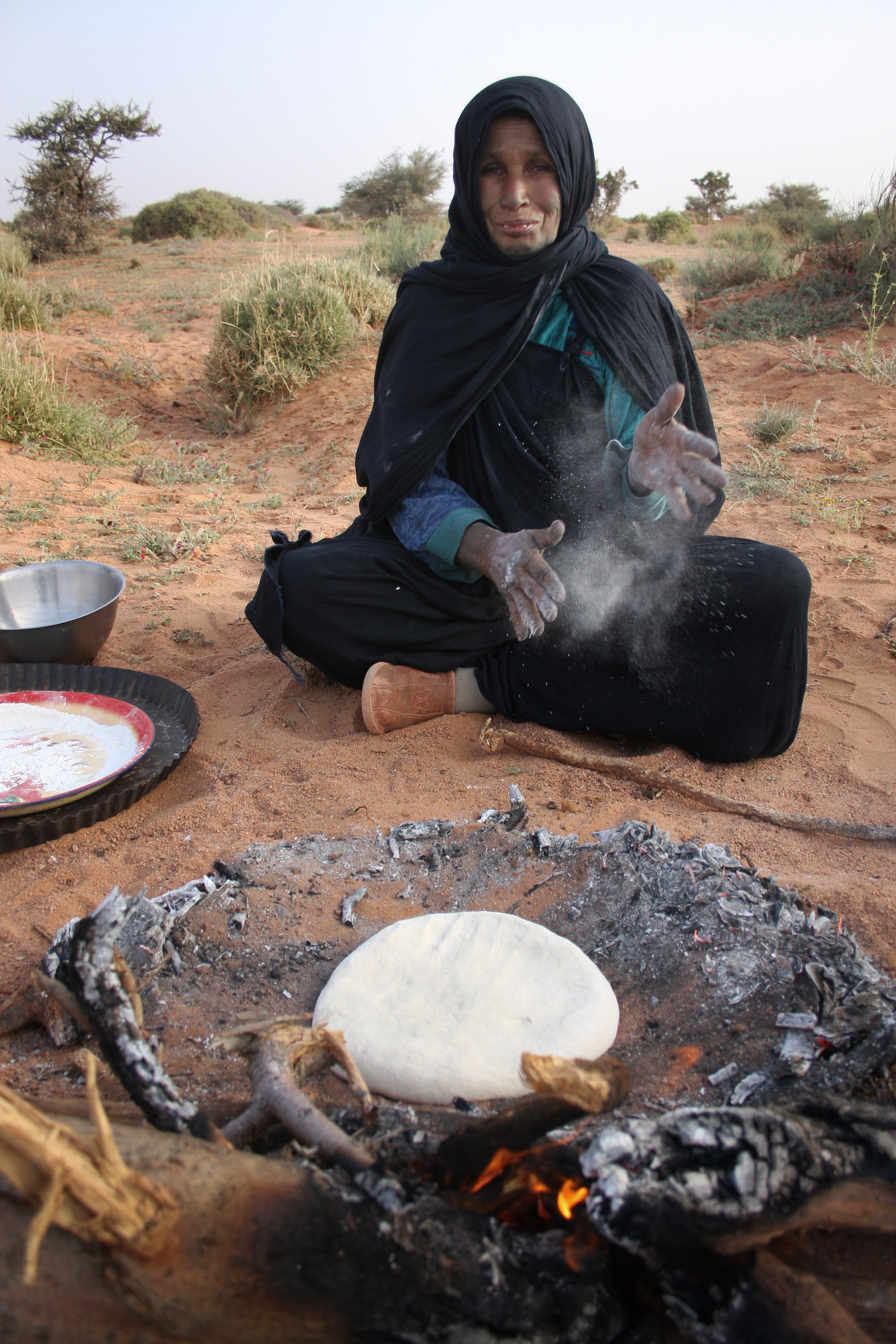

== See also ==
- Sahrawi
