= Jeannette Balou Tchichelle =

Jeannette Balou Tchichelle (1947–2005) was a Congolese and French writer. She was born in Brazzaville, Republic of the Congo. In 1969 she moved to France, where she lived with her three sons. In 1989, vanity press La Pensée Universelle published her book Coeur en exil (A Heart in Exile), in which she wrote about life in Paris and expressed a homesickness for her native country.
