= Patricia Glinton-Meicholas =

Bahamian writer, cultural critic, historian and educator

Patricia Laverne (Patti) Glinton-Meicholas (19 February 1950 – 2025) was a Bahamian writer, cultural critic, historian and educator. She was most known for her books Talkin' Bahamian and How To Be a True-True Bahamian which became bestsellers in the Bahamas.

== Early life and education ==
Patricia Glinton was born in Port Howe, Cat Island on 19 February 1950. She was one of four children of Carl and Patricia Glinton. She was educated at the University of the West Indies and the University of Miami.

== Career ==
Glinton was employed as an administrator at the College of the Bahamas, where she was also a lecturer and academic dean.

She co-founded the Bahamas Association for Cultural Studies in 1997 and has edited its journal Yinna. She wrote and directed six television historical documentaries for the Bahamas National Trust. She carried out field studies on various Bahamian islands. She wrote several academic papers and published a monograph on Bahamian folktales.

She was the first woman to present the Sir Lynden Pindling Memorial Lecture. Her poetry has appeared in various journals and she is included in the Anthology of Caribbean Poetry published by the Government of Guyana.

== Awards ==
Glinton was the first winner of the Bahamas Cacique Award for Writing in 1995. In 1998, she received the Silver Jubilee of Independence Medal for Literature.

The College of the Bahamas presented her with a Lifetime Achievement Award for culture and literature in 2014.

She was given an Order of Merit in the 2021 National Honours list.

== Personal life and death ==
Glinton-Meicholas was married to Neko Meicholas and the couple had one son.

== Selected works ==
Some of Patricia Glinton-Meicholas' works are:

- An Evening in Guanima, collected folktales (1993)
- A Shift in the Light, novel
- No Vacancy in Paradise, collected poems
- Robin’s Song, collected poems (2001)
- Chasing Light, collected poems (Proverse Hong Kong, 2013). Proverse Prize Finalist 2012.
- Years of Favour, history of the Roman Catholic Archdiocese of The Bahamas, with photographs by Neko Meicholas and Carla Glinton
- Bahamian Art 1492 to 1992, history, with Huggins and Smith
- Talkin' Bahamian
- More Talkin' Bahamian
- How To Be a True-True Bahamian
- How to Be a True-True Bahamian 2
- The Sinking of HMBS Flamingo and Its Roots in United States, Cuba and Bahamas Relationships.

Her poetry collection Chasing Light was a finalist in the 2012 International Proverse Prize Competition sponsored by Proverse Publishing Hong Kong.
