= Atlanta Boy Choir =

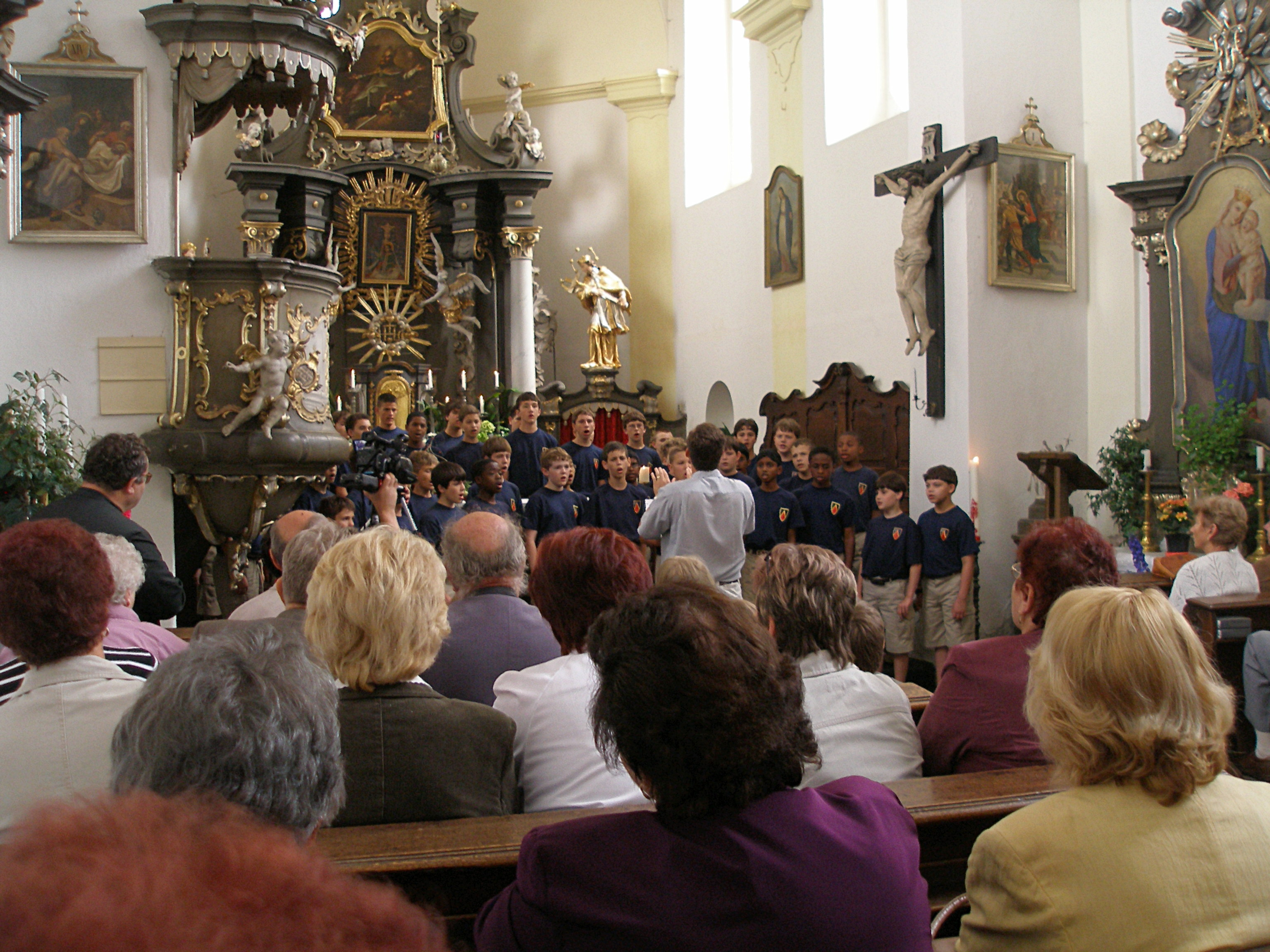
The Atlanta Boy Choir in concert at the St. Nicholas Church in Nový Knín (Czech Republic)

The Atlanta Boy Choir is a choral group for boys and men in Atlanta, Georgia. Originally founded in 1949 as an extracurricular program of the Atlanta Public Schools, the choir in its present form was incorporated in 1959 by Maestro Fletcher Wolfe and his wife Roberta Kahne Wolfe. The choir performs across North America and Europe.

The choir sang for Pope John Paul II at the Vatican City five times. In 2006, the choir returned to Italy where it performed for Pope Benedict XVI in St. Peter's Basilica. In 1966, the choir first performed at Carnegie Hall. in 1981, the choir was nominated for a Grammy Award for Carmina Burana, then was nominated again and won a Grammy Award in 1986 for its performance and recording of Britten’s [War Requiem] with the Atlanta Symphony Orchestra. The choir has performed on television and radio, and participated in solos and backups on various recordings such as The Power & The Majesty: Essential Choral Classics (1995) with conductor Robert Shaw and Classics for All Seasons (1994) with various composers/conductors. In 2009, the choir sang at Vienna's Musikverein during the International Haydn Festival commemorating the 200th anniversary of the death of Austrian composer Joseph Haydn. In 2016, the choir sang in Marvel's Captain America: Civil War film.

Other places where the choir has performed include St. Peter's Basilica in Rome, the White House in Washington, DC, St. Paul's Cathedral and Westminster Abbey in London, Notre Dame Cathedral in Paris, the Kennedy Center in Washington DC, and the Great Hall of the Philharmonic in St. Petersburg.

== History ==
The Atlanta Boy Choir was founded as part of the music program for the Atlanta City School System in 1946. That early boy choir briefly gave annual concerts locally and was composed of boys with unchanged voices. In 1953, a more active Atlanta Boy Choir was re-founded by George Crawford. That choir met at a local church. When Mr. Crawford relocated to Alabama, parents of the members of that early choir formed a new choir and chose Fletcher Wolfe as the founding director. That choir was legally incorporated as the Atlanta Boy Choir, Inc., in November 1959.

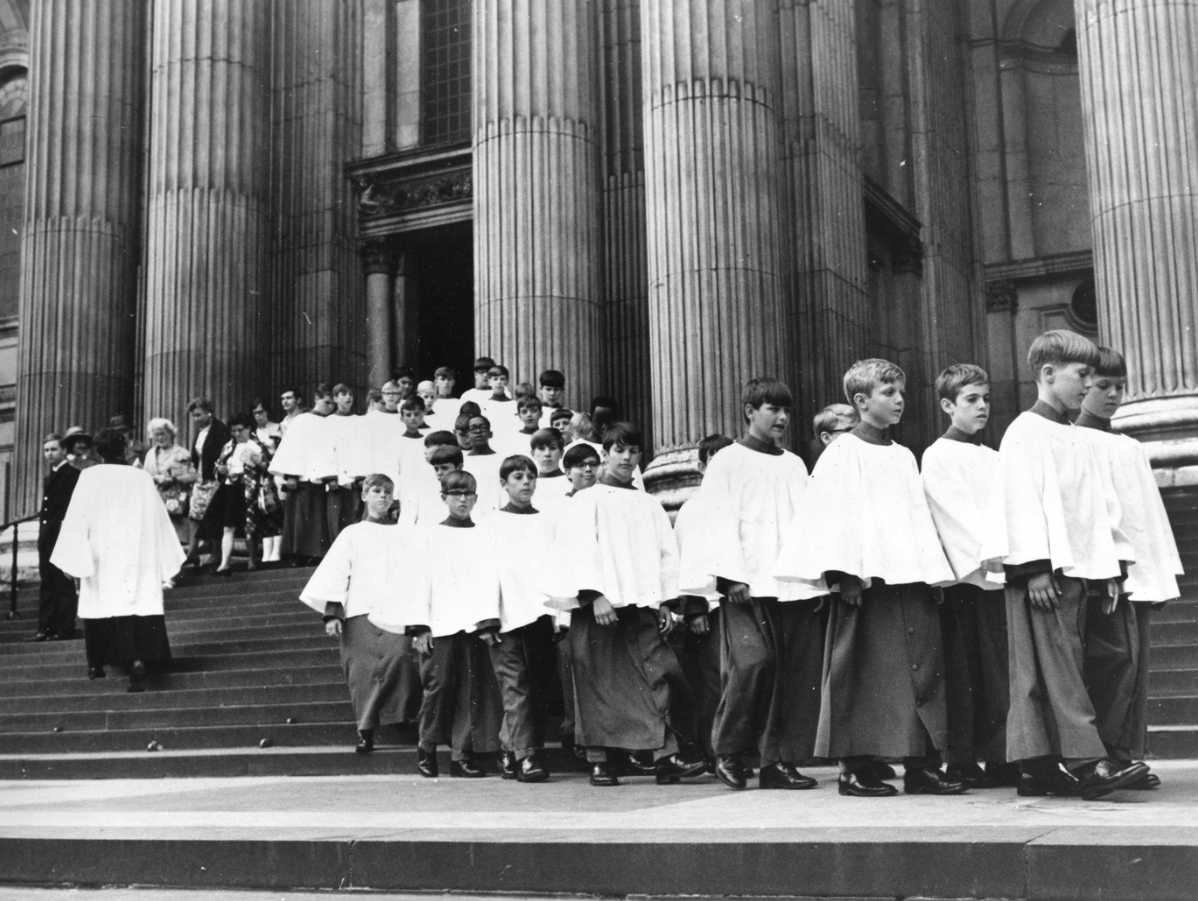
The Atlanta Boy Choir performed in St. Paul's Cathedral in 1969

Fletcher Wolfe continued to conduct the choir until the fall of 2001, when he retired and David White succeeded him. Maestro White continued the choir's collaborations with the Atlanta Symphony Orchestra and other area arts organizations and led the choir on tours of Russia and Austria. However, controversy arose between the conductor and the board of directors, who felt that White was obligating the choir financially without board approval. The board agreed to raise US$50,000, but only managed to raise $10,000 and had to take out a loan on the choir's Ponce De Leon Avenue spanish-revival mansion. In the summer of 2009, the board of directors dismissed Mr. White, and asked Fletcher Wolfe to return.

== Repertoire ==
Over 50 years the Atlanta Boy Choir had a broad repertoire ranging from choral masterworks of early composers such as Giovanni Pierluigi da Palestrina and Claudio Monteverdi, to contemporary masterworks of such composers as Benjamin Britten, Randall Thompson, and Krzysztof Penderecki. The choir has collaborated numerous times with the Atlanta Symphony Orchestra, and with conductors Robert Shaw and Yoel Levi.

== Performances and concert tours ==
According to the Boy Choir & Soloist Directory, the choir appeared before presidents, popes, foreign dignitaries, crowned heads of state, and U.S. soldiers. in 1961, the choir performed at the Palacio de Bellas Artes with the National Symphony Orchestra (Mexico) preceding the visit of newly elected U.S. President John F. Kennedy. In 2004, the Atlanta Boy Choir toured Greece as part of the 2004 Cultural Olympiad before the 2004 Summer Olympics in Athens. The Fall 2005 season brought Carmina Burana back into the repertoire of the choir, as the performed alongside the Michael O'Neill Singers and the Atlanta Ballet at the Fabulous Fox Theater. On February 6, 2006, the Atlanta Boy Choir was honored to participate in a musical memorial service for Coretta Scott King, the late widow of Dr. Martin Luther King, Jr. at Ebenezer Baptist Church. In June of 2006, the Atlanta Boy Choir traveled to Italy, visiting Palestrina, Rome, Venice, Montepulciano, Siena, Florence, Assisi, and Pisa. On this tour, the choir sang portions of the Latin Mass for Pope Benedict XVI at St. Peter's Basilica in Vatican City. The choir has also visited England, Scotland, Wales, France, Germany, Italy, Switzerland, Austria, Belgium, Spain, Morocco, Hungary, Yugoslavia, Czechoslovakia, Finland, Russia, Portugal, Yugoslavia, Czechoslovakia, Canada, and Mexico.

== Recordings ==
The choir was nominated for a Grammy Award for their part in the famous 1981 Robert Shaw-led Atlanta Symphony Chorus and Orchestra recording of Carmina Burana by Carl Orff. In 1989, the choir was nominated a second time, winning a Grammy Award for its performance and recording of Britten's [War Requiem] with the Atlanta Symphony Orchestra. The choir has been featured on television, radio, and participated in solos and backups on various recordings such as The Power & The Majesty: Essential Choral Classics (1995) with conductor Robert Shaw and Classics for All Seasons (1994) with various composers/conductors. Under the direction of Dr. David R. White, the choir recorded a number of albums: Garden of Beauty (featuring pieces by Rene Clausen and Randall Thompson), Over Jordan (a focus on American Spirituals with Samuel L Jackson narrating The Creation), and Dancing Day (named for the Sir John Rutter's Dancing Day, a cycle of 8 carols tied together by a solo harp prelude and interludes).

== Since 2009 ==
Fletcher Wolfe returned as conductor of the Atlanta Boy Choir, and the boy choir and the men's choir completed a concert tour of Italy. They performed Sunday Mass at St. Peter's Basilica in the Vatican City and gave performances at the Basilica of St. Francis in Assisi and Siena Cathedral in Siena. In 2011, the choir took a tour to Alaska. In 2012, the Boy Choir toured to Russia where it performed at the Great Hall of the Philharmonic and the Winter Palace. During the summer of 2013, the choir took a tour of Nova Scotia in Canada. The Choir was invited to perform in Poland and The Czech Republic in 2014. In 2016, the choir participated in a funeral scene, singing Pie Jesu from the Fauré Requiem as part of Marvel's Captain America: Civil War film. Following the Summer Tour to Nova Scotia in the summer of 2017 the founding director retired (again), and was succeeded after a few months by Dr. Robert Henry. In 2018, the choir sold their property on Ponce de Leon Avenue in Atlanta.

Under Dr. Henry's leadership, the choir was invited multiple times to sing for the Georgia State Capitol Tree Lighting Ceremony, several Martin Luther King Jr Day events, and for the funeral for former AmEx CEO James D. Robinson III.

In 2025, the Board of Trustees voted to hire S. Bryan Priddy to take the helm of the choir, in an effort to further rebuild the institution and currently boasts nearly 50 choristers. The choir will be touring the Southeast United States in June 2026.
