= Political views of Harold Pinter =

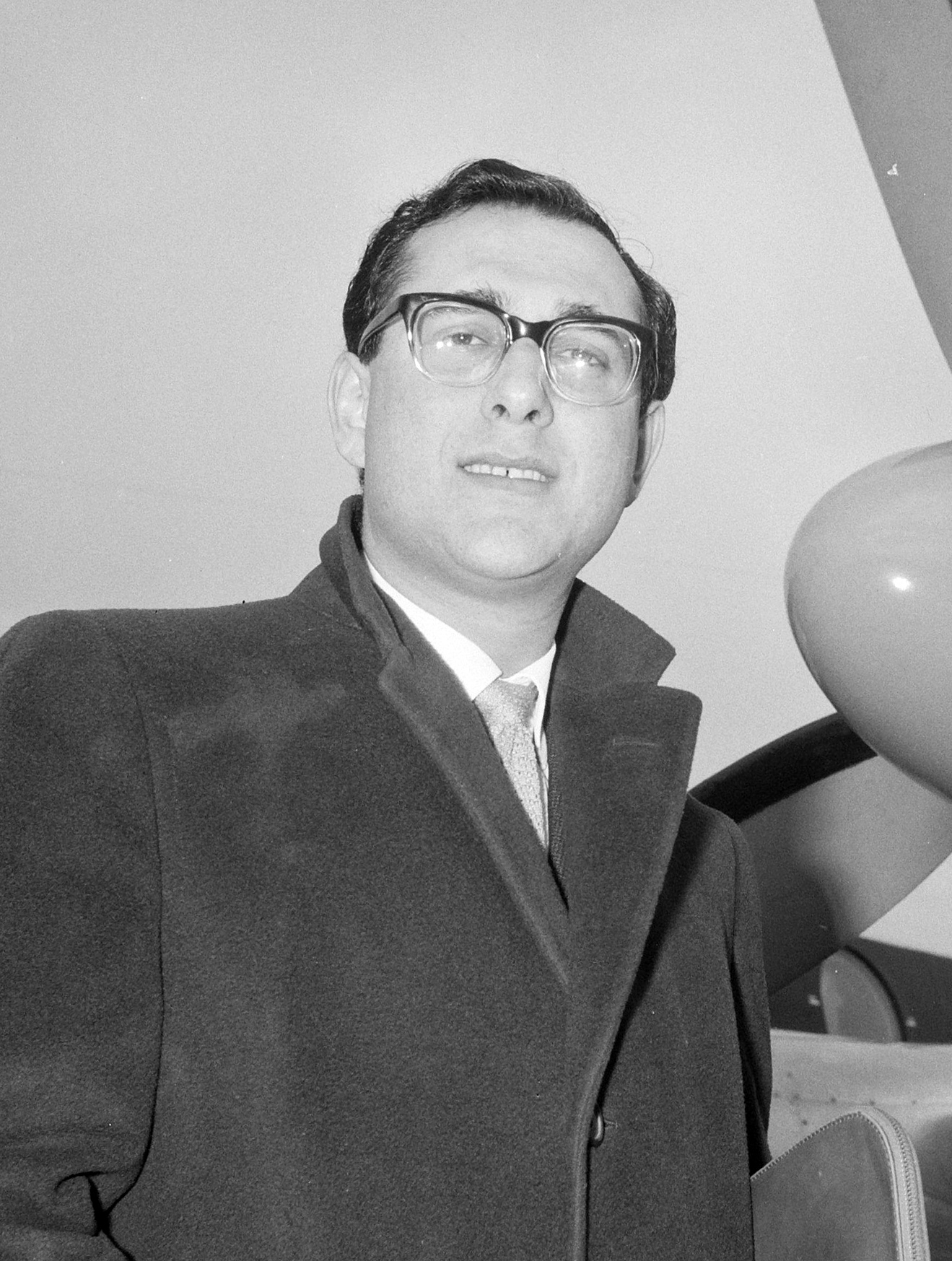
Harold Pinter in 1962

Harold Pinter and politics concerns the political views, civic engagement, and political activism of British playwright Harold Pinter (1930–2008), the 2005 Nobel Laureate in Literature.

== Early political views ==
In 1948–49, when he was 18, Pinter opposed the politics of the Cold War, leading to his decision to become a conscientious objector and to refuse to comply with National Service. But he was not a pacifist. He told Billington and others that, if he had been old enough at the time, he would have fought against the Nazis in World War II (Harold Pinter 21–24, 92, & 286). He seemed to express ambivalence about "politicians" in his 1966 Paris Review interview conducted by Lawrence M. Bensky. Yet, he had actually been an early member of the Campaign for Nuclear Disarmament in the United Kingdom and also had supported the British Anti-Apartheid Movement (1959–1994), participating in British artists' refusal to permit professional productions of their work in South Africa, by signing the "Public Declaration of Playwrights Against Apartheid" in 1963 (Hadley) and in subsequent related campaigns (Mbeki; Reddy).

== Later civic activities and political activism ==
In the 1979 general election, Pinter voted for the Conservatives, led by Margaret Thatcher, "as a protest against a strike at the National Theatre that was dogging a production he was directing." He later said of this that it was "the most shameful act of my life". In his last twenty-five years, Pinter increasingly focused his essays, speeches, interviews, literary readings, and other public appearances directly on contemporary political issues. Pinter strongly opposed the 1991 Gulf War, the 1999 NATO bombing campaign in Yugoslavia during the Kosovo War, the United States' 2001 War in Afghanistan, and the 2003 Invasion of Iraq. His political statements have elicited some strong public criticism and even, at times, provoked ridicule and personal attacks. David Edgar (writing in the Guardian) defended Pinter against what he terms Pinter's "being berated by the belligerati" like Hari and others, who, unlike his supporters such as Edgar, Sir Tom Stoppard, David Hare, and Václav Havel, felt that Pinter did not "deserve" to win the Nobel Prize.

In accepting an honorary degree at the University of Turin (27 November 2002), he stated: "I believe that [the United States] will [attack Iraq] not only to take control of Iraqi oil, but also because the American administration is now a bloodthirsty wild animal. Bombs are its only vocabulary." Distinguishing between "the American administration" and American citizens, he added the following qualification: "Many Americans, we know, are horrified by the posture of their government but seem to be helpless" (Various Voices [2005] 243). He was very active in the antiwar movement in the United Kingdom, speaking at rallies held by the Stop the War Coalition (StWC).

In his various public speeches and other appearances, describing former President of the United States George W. Bush as a "mass murderer" and former Prime Minister of the United Kingdom Tony Blair as both "mass-murdering" and a "deluded idiot", Pinter specified that, along with other past U.S. officials, under the Geneva Conventions, they are "war criminals". He compared the Bush administration with Adolf Hitler's Nazi Germany, in its striving to attain "world domination" through "Full spectrum dominance": "Nazi Germany wanted total domination of Europe and they nearly did it. The US wants total domination of the world and is about to consolidate that. … In a policy document, the US has used the term 'full-spectrum domination', that means control of land, sea, air and space, and that is exactly what's intended and what the US wants to fulfil. They are quite blatant about it." Referring to the 2003 invasion of Iraq, in a public reading presented in 2003, Pinter "blamed 'millions of totally deluded American people' for not staging a mass revolt" and "said that because of propaganda and control of the media, millions of Americans believed that every word Mr Bush said was 'accurate and moral'."

== Official political statements ==
On his official website, Pinter published his remarks to the mass peace protest demonstration held in London on 15 February 2003: "The United States is a monster out of control. Unless we challenge it with absolute determination American barbarism will destroy the world. The country is run by a bunch of criminal lunatics, with Blair as their hired Christian thug. The planned attack on Iraq is an act of premeditated mass murder" ("Speech at Hyde Park"). Those remarks anticipated his observation in his 2005 Nobel Lecture, "Art, Truth and Politics" that whereas Bush, like "all American presidents" had hypnotically enlisted " 'the American people to trust their president in the action he is about to take on behalf of the American people.' "; nevertheless, "Many thousands, if not millions, of people in the United States itself are demonstrably sickened, shamed and angered by their government's actions, but as things stand they are not a coherent political force—yet. But the anxiety, uncertainty and fear which we can see growing daily in the United States is unlikely to diminish" (21).

In accepting the Wilfred Owen Award for Poetry, on 18 March 2005, wondering "What would Wilfred Owen make of the invasion of Iraq? A bandit act, an act of blatant state terrorism, demonstrating absolute contempt for the conception of international law?", Pinter concluded: "I believe Wilfred Owen would share our contempt, our revulsion, our nausea and our shame at both the language and the actions of the American and British governments" (Various Voices [2005] 247–48). The following year, in March 2006, upon accepting the Europe Theatre Prize, in Turin, Pinter exhorted the mostly European audience "to resist the power of the United States," stating, "I'd like to see Europe echo the example of Latin America in withstanding the economic and political intimidation of the United States. This is a serious responsibility for Europe and all of its citizens."

Pinter was active in International PEN, serving as a vice president, along with American playwright Arthur Miller. In 1985, Pinter and Miller went to Turkey, on a mission co-sponsored by International PEN and a Helsinki Watch committee to investigate and protest against the torture of imprisoned writers. There he met victims of political oppression and their families. At an American embassy dinner in Ankara, held in Miller's honour, at which Pinter was also an invited guest, speaking on behalf of those imprisoned Turkish writers, Pinter confronted the ambassador with (in Pinter's words) "the reality ... of electric current on your genitals": Pinter's outspokenness apparently angered their host, who asked Pinter to leave, and, in solidarity, Miller left the embassy with him. Recounting this episode for a tribute to Miller on his 80th birthday, Pinter concluded: "Being thrown out of the US embassy in Ankara with Arthur Miller—a voluntary exile—was one of the proudest moments in my life" ("Arthur Miller's Socks," Various Voices [2005] 56–57). Pinter's experiences in Turkey and his knowledge of the Turkish suppression of the Kurdish language "inspired" his 1988 play Mountain Language. He was also an active member of the Cuba Solidarity Campaign, an organisation describing itself as one which "campaigns in the UK against the US blockade of Cuba and for the Cuban peoples' right to self-determination and sovereignty".

Although conceding that the former Serb leader was "ruthless and savage", in 2001 Pinter joined the International Committee to Defend Slobodan Milošević (ICDSM), which appealed for the former Serbian leader to be given a fair trial and for his freedom, signing a related "Artists' Appeal for Milošević" in 2004.

== Political activism in his final years ==
In the last few years of his life, Pinter continued to contribute letters to the editor, essays, speeches, and poetry strongly expressing his artistic and political viewpoints, which were frequently published initially in British periodicals, both in print and electronic media, and distributed and re-distributed extensively over the internet and throughout the blogosphere. These were distributed more widely after his winning the Nobel Prize in Literature in 2005; his subsequent publications and related news accounts cite his status as a Nobel Laureate. Later he continued to sign petitions on behalf of artistic and political causes that he supported. He signed the mission statement of Jews for Justice for Palestinians in 2005 and its full-page advertisement, "What Is Israel Doing? A Call by Jews in Britain", published in The Times on 6 July 2006. He also co-signed an open letter about events in the Middle East dated 19 July 2006, distributed to the press on 21 July 2006, and posted on the website of Noam Chomsky. On 5 February 2007 The Independent reported that, along with historian Eric Hobsbawm, human rights lawyer Geoffrey Bindman, fashion designer Nicole Farhi, film director Mike Leigh, and actors Stephen Fry and Zoë Wanamaker, among others, Harold Pinter launched the organization Independent Jewish Voices in the United Kingdom "to represent British Jews ... in response to a perceived pro-Israeli bias in existing Jewish bodies in the UK", and, according to Hobsbawm, "as a counter-balance to the uncritical support for Israeli policies by established bodies such as the Board of Deputies of British Jews" (Hodgson; IJV Declaration). In March 2007 American television interviewer and journalist Charlie Rose conducted "A Conversation with Harold Pinter" on Charlie Rose, filmed at the Old Vic, in London, and broadcast on television in the United States on PBS. They discussed highlights of his career and the politics of his life and work. They debated his ongoing opposition to the Iraq War, with Rose challenging some of Pinter's views about the United States. They also discussed some of his other public protests and positions in public controversies, such as that involving the New York Theatre Workshop's cancellation of their production of My Name Is Rachel Corrie, which Pinter viewed as an act of cowardice amounting to self-censorship. In mid-June 2008, opposing "a police ban on the George Bush Not Welcome Here" demonstration organized by the Stop the War Coalition (StWC), "Pinter commented, 'The ban on the Stop The War Coalition march in protest at the visit of President Bush to this country [England] is a totalitarian act. In what is supposed to be a free country the Coalition has every right to express its views peacefully and openly. This ban is outrageous and makes the term "democracy" laughable'."

== Retrospective on political aspects of his early works ==
David Edgar's argument in "Pinter's Weasels" that "The idea that he was a dissenting figure only in later life ignores the politics of his early work," echoes Pinter's own retrospective perspective on it. In "A Play and Its Politics", an interview conducted by Nicholas Hern in February 1985 and published in the Methuen and Grove Press editions of One for the Road, Pinter described his earlier plays retrospectively from the perspective of the politics of power and the dynamics of oppression. He also expressed such a perspective on his work when he participated in "Meet the Author" with Ramona Koval, at the Edinburgh International Book Festival, in Edinburgh, Scotland, on the evening of 25 August 2006. It was his first public appearance in Britain since he had won the 2005 Nobel Prize in Literature and his near-death experience in hospital in the first week of December 2005, which had prevented him from going to Stockholm to give his Nobel Lecture in person. Pinter described how he felt while almost dying (as if he were "drowning"). After reading an interrogation scene from The Birthday Party, he explained that he "wanted to say that Goldberg and McCann represented the forces in society who wanted to snuff out dissent, to stifle Stanley's voice, to silence him," and that in 1958 "One thing [the critics who almost unanimously hated the play] got wrong ... was the whole history of stifling, suffocating and destroying dissent. Not too long before, the Gestapo had represented order, discipline, family life, obligation—and anyone who disagreed with that was in trouble."

In both his writing and his public speaking, McDowell observes,

Pinter's precision of language is immensely political. Twist words like "democracy" and "freedom", as he believes Blair and Bush have done over Iraq, and hundreds of thousands of people die.

In [March 2006], when he was presented with the European [sic] Theatre Prize in Turin, Pinter said he intended to spend the rest of his life railing against the United States. Surely, asked chair Ramona Koval, [at the Edinburgh Book Festival that August], he was doomed to fail?

"Oh yes—me against the United States!" he said, laughing along with the audience at the absurdity, before adding: "But I can't stop reacting to what is done in our name, and what is being done in the name of freedom and democracy is disgusting."

== "Politics" at HaroldPinter.org ==
In 2000 Harold Pinter launched his official website, which includes a section specifically devoted to his interest and activities in "Politics" with a hyperlinked subsection listing the political organisations and causes that he supported during his lifetime. The site includes some hyperlinks to another section, containing Pinter's politically charged poetry. Prior to his death, these parts of his official website were occasionally updated periodically by his various personal assistants.

The Harold Pinter Community Discussion Forum at HaroldPinter.org contains threads pertaining to Pinter and politics. Leading up to and after the 2003 Invasion of Iraq, these threads became more frequent and at times more heated in nature, particular in reference to Pinter's opposition to that Iraq War, his other political activism and statements relating to it, and his winning of the 2005 Nobel Prize in Literature.

== Approval of the election of U.S. President Barack Obama ==
In the final months of his life, Pinter demonstrated his enthusiastic approval of the election of Barack Obama as U.S. President.

== See also ==
- The arts and politics
- Art, Truth and Politics: The Nobel Lecture
- Belarus Free Theatre

== Works cited and further reading ==
Anderson, Porter. "Harold Pinter: Theater's Angry Old Man: At the Prize of Europe, the Playwright Is All Politics." CNN.com. CNN, 17 March 2006. Web. 2 October 2007.

Batiukov, Michael. "Belarus 'Free Theatre' Is Under Attack by Militia in Minsk, Belarus". American Chronicle. Ultio, LLC, 22 August 2007. Web. 2 October 2007.

Batty, Mark. About Pinter: The Playwright and the Work. London: Faber, 2005. ISBN 0-571-22005-3 (10). ISBN 978-0-571-22005-2 (13). Print. [Includes chap. 9, "Views on Pinter: Friends and Collaborators" on 155–221.]

Billington, Michael. Harold Pinter. London: Faber, 2007. ISBN 978-0-571-23476-9 (13). Updated 2nd ed. of The Life and Work of Harold Pinter. 1996. London: Faber, 1997. ISBN 0-571-17103-6 (10). Print.

–––. "The Importance of Being Pinter: A New Production by the Belarus Free Theatre Reinforces the Global Resonance of the British Playwright's Political Works". Guardian, Arts blog – Theatre. Guardian Media Group, 16 April 2007. Web. 16 April 2007.

–––. "Krapp's Last Tape: 4 Stars Royal Court, London". Guardian, Theatre. Guardian Media Group, 16 October 2006. Web. 6 January 2009.

–––. "Passionate Pinter's Devastating Assault On US Foreign Policy: Shades of Beckett As Ailing Playwright Delivers Powerful Nobel Lecture." Guardian. Guardian Media Group, 8 December 2005, Books. Web. 2 October 2007.

–––. "We Are Catching Up With This Man's Creative Talent At Last: The Current Rash of Pinter Revivals Is about Far More Than Guilt or Respect. Both Artistically and Politically, He Was Ahead of the Pack." Guardian, Comment. Guardian Media Group, 1 March 2007. Web. 11 October 2007.

Swedish Academy. "Biobibliographical Notes" and "Bibliography" for "Harold Pinter, Nobel Prize in Literature 2005." In "Bio-bibliography", The Nobel Prize in Literature 2005. nobelprize.org. The Swedish Academy and The Nobel Foundation, Oct. 2005. Web. 6 January 2009. (English HTML version.) [Additional PDF versions accessible in English, French, German, and Swedish via hyperlinks.]

Bond, Paul. "Harold Pinter's Artistic Achievement". World Socialist Web Site. World Socialist Web Site, 29 December 2005. Web. 2 October 2007.

Brantley, Ben. "Harold Pinter". New York Times, Times Topics . New York Times Company, 2009 (updated periodically). Web. 6 January 2009. [Introd. to hyperlinked Harold Pinter News––New York Times; includes menu of recommended external links.]

–––. "A Master of Menace." (Audio file.) (See "Multimedia resources" listed below.)

–––. "Theater Review: The Homecoming (Cort Theater): You Can Go Home Again, But You'll Pay the Consequences". New York Times 17 December 2007, The Arts: E1. Print. New York Times Company, 17 December 2007. Web. 17 December 2007.

Brown, Mark. "What Is It (War) Good for?" Socialist Review. Socialist Review, Sept. 2003. Web. 2 October 2007. [Book rev. of War, by Harold Pinter.]

"Bush and Blair Slated by Pinter". BBC News. BBC, 7 December 2005. Web. 2 October 2007. (Features related links.)

The Cambridge Companion to Harold Pinter. Ed. Peter Raby. Cambridge Companions to Literature. Cambridge: Cambridge UP, 2001. ISBN 0-521-65842-X (10). ISBN 978-0-521-65842-3 (13). Print. Cambridge Collections Online. Cambridge University Press, n.d. Web. 11 October 2007. [Hyperlinked table of contents.]

Chomsky, Noam. "Comments on Dershowitz". ZNet. Z Communications, 6 September 2006. Web. 7 September 2006. (Followed by text by Alan Dershowitz.)

–––. "Israel, Lebanon, and Palestine: Archived 1 October 2006 at the Wayback Machine Tariq Ali, John Berger, Noam Chomsky, Eduardo Galeano, Naomi Klein, Harold Pinter, Arundhati Roy, José Saramago & Howard Zinn" (Updated signatures). chomsky.info . Noam Chomsky, 19 July 2006. Web, 4 October 2007.

Chrisafis, Angelique, and Imogen Tilden. "Pinter Blasts 'Nazi America' and 'deluded idiot' Blair". Guardian. Guardian Media Group, 11 June 2003. Web. 2 October 2007.

Coppa, Francesca. "The Sacred Joke: Comedy and Politics in Pinter's Early Plays". 44–56 in The Cambridge Companion to Harold Pinter. Ed. Peter Raby. Cambridge: Cambridge UP, 2001. Print. Cambridge Collections Online. Cambridge University Press, n.d. Web. 4 January 2009. [Extract; registered account required for access to full text.]

Cuba Solidarity Campaign in the UK (CSC). Cuba Solidarity Campaign in the UK, 2009. Web, 24 June 2009. (Official Website updated periodically.) [Site originally entitled Hands Off Cuba! when Pinter first began supporting the CSC and when Retrieved 3 October 2007 (see below). Re-titled The Cuba Solidarity Campaign in the UK. According to his official website, not yet fully updated, "Harold Pinter is an active delegate and speaker on behalf of the CSC, especially in its campaign against the US Embargo" ("Political organisations" and causes supported by Pinter as hyperlinked in "Politics" in HaroldPinter.org, 2000–[2009]. Web, 24 June 2009.]

Edgar, David. "Pinter's Weasels". The Guardian, Comment Is Free. Guardian Media Group, 29 December 2008. Web, 24 June 2009.

Ferguson, Niall. "Personal View: Do the Sums, Then Compare US and Communist Crimes from the Cold War". Telegraph. Telegraph Media Group, 11 December 2005. Web. 9 May 2009.

Filichia, Peter. "McCarter Gives Pinter a Happy 'Birthday Party' ". Star-Ledger. McCarter Theatre Ticket Office (Reviews), 18 September 2006. Web. 2 October 2007.

Freed, Donald. "The Courage of Harold Pinter". Presentation at Artist and Citizen: 50 Years of Performing Pinter. University of Leeds, 13 April 2007. Another America. Donald Freed, Apr. 2007. Web. 28 May 2007.

French Embassy in the United Kingdom. "Harold Pinter Awarded Légion d'Honneur". France in the United Kingdom. French Embassy (UK), 17 January 2007. Web. 3 October 2007. (Press release.)

"French PM Honours Harold Pinter". BBC News. BBC, 18 January 2007. Web. 2 October 2007.

Gardner, M.C. "Harold Pinter's War". Book rev. Another America Journal. Lightning Source, Inc., 2003. Another America. Donald Freed, May 2007. Web. 6 January 2009.

Grimes, Charles. Harold Pinter's Politics: A Silence Beyond Echo. Madison & Teaneck: Fairleigh Dickinson UP; Cranbury, NJ: Associated UP, 2005. ISBN 0-8386-4050-8. Print.

Gussow, Mel. Conversations with Pinter. London: Nick Hern Books, 1994. ISBN 1-85459-201-7. Rpt. New York: Limelight, 2004. ISBN 0-87910-179-2. Print.

Hadley, Kathryn. "Forward to Freedom". History Today News, History in the News. History Today Magazine, 15 June 2009. Web. 25 June 2009.

Hari, Johann. "Johann Hari: Pinter Does Not Deserve the Nobel Prize: The Only Response to His Nobel Rant (and Does Anyone Doubt It Will Be a Rant?) Will Be a Long, Long Pause" (column). Independent, Comment. Independent News & Media, 6 December 2005. Johann Hari, 2 October 2007. Web. 12 October 2007. (Archived in johannhari.com.)

"Harold Pinter Meets Free Theatre in Leeds". Press release. Belarus Free Theatre. Belarus Free Theatre, 2 May 2007. Web. 2 October 2007. [English version has some typographical errors; also accessible in Belarusian [p??????] and in French [français]. Features photographs reposted from Mark Taylor-Batty's University of Leeds Website for the conference Artist and Citizen: 50 Years of Performing Pinter.]

"Harold Pinter Taken to Hospital". BBC News. BBC, 30 November 2005. Web. 7 May 2009.

Hickling, Alfred. "Being Harold Pinter ***** Workshop, University of Leeds". Guardian. Guardian Media Group, 16 April 2007. Web. 2 October 2007.

Higgins, Charlotte. "Edinburgh Festival: Two-act rant from Sean and Harold". Guardian. Guardian Media Group, 26 August 2006. Web. 2 October 2007.

Hinchliffe, Arnold P. Harold Pinter. The Griffin Authors Ser. New York: St. Martin's P, 1967. Print.

Hitchens, Christopher. "Opinion: The Sinister Mediocrity of Harold Pinter". Wall Street Jour. 17 October 2005, A18. Print. Wall Street Journal (Dow Jones & Company), 17 October 2005. Web. 7 May 2009. [Electronic ed.; printable version "for personal, non-commercial use only."]

Howard, Jennifer. "Nobel Prize in Literature Goes to Harold Pinter, British Playwright Widely Studied in Academe". Chronicle of Higher Education. Chronicle of Higher Education, 13 October 2006. Web. 2 October 2007.

Karwowski, Michael. "Harold Pinter – a Political Playwright?"] Contemporary Review 283.1654 (Nov. 2003): 291–96..

"Letter of Motivation for the European Theatre Prize". 10th Edition of the Europe Theatre Prize to Harold Pinter ("X Premio Europa per il teatro a Harold Pinter"). premio-europa.org. Europe Theatre Prize, Turin, Italy, 8–12 March 2006. Web. 10 March 2009.

Lyall, Sarah. "Playwright Takes a Prize and a Jab at U.S." New York Times. New York Times Company, 8 December 2006. Web. 2 October 2007. [Correction appended 10 December 2005: "An article on Thursday about the playwright Harold Pinter's criticism of American foreign policy in his acceptance speech for the Nobel Prize for literature described it incompletely. He said that both President Bush and Prime Minister Tony Blair - and not just Prime Minister Blair - should be tried before the International Criminal Court of Justice for the invasion of Iraq."]

Mbeki, Thabo. "Letter from the President: Hail the Nobel Laureates - Apostles of Human Curiosity!". ANC Today ("Online Voice of the African National Congress") 5.42 (21–27 October 2005). African National Congress, 12 November 2007. Web.

[McDowell, Leslie.] "Book Festival Reviews: Pinter at 75: The Anger Still Burns: Harold Pinter". The Scotsman 26 August 2006: 5. Print. The Scotsman Publications Limited (Johnston Press Plc), (updated) 27 August 2006. Web. 6 January 2009.

Merritt, Susan Hollis. "(Anti-)Global Pinter." The Pinter Review: Nobel Prize/Europe Theatre Prize Volume: 2005 – 2008. Ed. Francis Gillen with Steven H. Gale. Tampa: U of Tampa P, 2008. 140–67. Print.

–––. "Harold Pinter's Ashes to Ashes: Political/Personal Echoes of the Holocaust." The Pinter Review: Collected Essays 1999 and 2000. Ed. Francis Gillen and Steven H. Gale. Tampa: U of Tampa P, 2000. 73–84. Print.

–––. Pinter in Play: Critical Strategies and the Plays of Harold Pinter. 1990. Durham and London: Duke UP, 1995. ISBN 0-8223-1674-9 (10). ISBN 978-0-8223-1674-9 (13). Print. [Chap. 8: "Cultural Politics" (171–209) includes a section entitled "Pinter and Politics" (171–86) and related sections entitled "Pinter's Future as a Political Dramatist" (186–89), "Sociological Role-Playing and Class Consciousness in Pinter: Ewald Mengel" (189–94), "Pinter and Sex" (194–204), and "Relations of Gender and Personal Concerns in Criticism" (204–209).]

–––. "Talking about Pinter." (On the Lincoln Center Festival 2001: Harold Pinter Festival Symposia.) The Pinter Review: Collected Essays 2001 and 2002. Ed. Francis Gillen and Steven H. Gale. Tampa: U of Tampa P, 2002. 144–67. Print.

Moss, Stephen. "The Guardian Profile: Harold Pinter: Under the Volcano". Guardian. Guardian Media Group, 4 September 1999. Web. 2 October 2007.

"The Nobel Prize for Literature 2005: Harold Pinter". Guardian. Guardian Media Group, [2005–2009]. Web. 23 March 2009. (Index of articles; some part of "Special Reports: The Nobel Prize for Literature" in 2005.)

"Palestinian Nation Under Threat". Independent. Independent News & Media, 21 July 2006. World Wide Web. 3 October 2007.

Parini, Jay. "Theater: Pinter's Plays, Pinter's Politics". Chronicle of Higher Education, Chronicle Rev. Chronicle of Higher Education, 11 November 2005. World Wide Web. 2 October 2007. (3 pages.)

Pilger, John. "The Silence of Writers". ZNet. Z Communications, 16 October 2005. Web. 5 July 2006.

Pinter, Harold. "Pinter: Torture and Misery in the Name of Freedom" Archived 16 February 2010 at the Wayback Machine, adapted from his 2005 acceptance speech for the Wilfred Owen Award for poetry, rpt. in Independent, Independent News & Media, 16 October 2005, Web, 24 June 2009. [Includes " A Colossal Figure' ".]

"Pinter Honoured for a Lifetime's Contribution to the Arts". University of Leeds press release. University of Leeds, 13 April 2007. Web. 15 April 2007.

"Pinter Wins Nobel Literary Prize". BBC News . BBC, 13 October 2005. Web. 2 October 2007.

"Protesters Will Defy Ban on Anti-Bush Demo on Sunday 15 June". Socialist Worker Online (UK). Socialist Worker, 14 June 2008. Web. 12 June 2008.

Pryce-Jones, David. "Harold Pinter's Special Triteness: Harold Pinter Wins the Nobel Prize in Literature." National Review 7 November 2005. National Review Online (National Review, Inc.), 28 October 2005. Web. 3 March 2009. Rpt. in "News Publications: 2005 Ad". BNET: Business Network. FindArticles (Gale Cengage Learning), 2008. CBS Interactive, Inc., 2009. Web. 7 March 2009. (3 pages.)

Quigley, Austin E. "Pinter, Politics and Postmodernmism (I)." 7–27 in The Cambridge Companion to Harold Pinter. Print.

Reddy, E.S. "Free Mandela: An Account of the Campaign to Free Nelson Mandela and All Other Political Prisoners in South Africa." African National Congress (ANC): Documents: History of Campaigns. African National Congress, July 1988. Web. 5 January 2009.

Riddell, Mary. "Comment: Prophet without Honour: Harold Pinter Can Be Cantankerous and Puerile. But He Is a Worthy Nobel Prizewinner." Guardian.co.uk. Guardian Media Group, 11 December 2005. Web. 6 January 2009.

Robinson, David. "Books: Doyle Returns to an Old Favourite in New Work; . . . Harold Pinter". Scotsman, Living. Scotsman, 28 August 2006. Web. 2 October 2007.

–––. "I'm Written Out, Says Controversial Pinter". Scotsman 26 August 2006: 6. Print. Scotsman, 26 August 2006. Web. 26 August 2006.

Sheffield Theatres. "Latest News: August 2006: Sheffield Theatres Presents Pinter: A Celebration". Press release. Sheffield Theatres, 18 August 2006. Web. 7 January 2009.

Shenton, Mark. "Pinter in Turin". Stage Blogs: Shenton's View. Stage Newspaper Limited, 11 March 2006. Web. 15 March 2009.

Smith, Neil. " 'Political element' to Pinter Prize?" BBC News. BBC, 13 October 2005. Web. 2 October 2007.

"Special Report: The Nobel Prize for Literature: 2005 Harold Pinter" Archived 14 October 2008 at the Wayback Machine. Guardian. Guardian Media Group, 2 October 2007. World Wide Web. 2 October 2007. (Features links relating to Harold Pinter's 2005 Nobel Prize in Literature. [Periodically updated and re-located.])

Swedish Academy. "The Nobel Prize in Literature 2005: Harold Pinter". Nobelprize.org. Swedish Academy and Nobel Foundation, 13 October 2005. Web. 4 October 2007. (Hyperlinked account. Provides links to the official Nobel Prize announcement, Bio-bibliography, Bibliography, press release, press conference, and audio and video streaming media files of the press conference and related interviews and features. These resources are accessible on the official websites of both the Nobel Prize (Nobel Foundation) and the Swedish Academy; they are periodically revised and re-located.)

Traub, James. "The Way We Live Now: Their Highbrow Hatred of Us". New York Times Mag.. New York Times Company, 30 October 2005. Web. 30 October 2005. (Site registration may be required.)

Wästberg, Per. "The Nobel Prize in Literature 2005: Presentation Speech". Nobelprize.org. The Nobel Foundation and The Swedish Academy, 10 December 2005. Web, 2 October 2007. (Full text; links to video clips of the Nobel Ceremony provided online.)

Wilfred Owen Association Newsletter 4 August 2004. Print.

Woolf, Henry. "My 60 Years in Harold's Gang". Guardian.co.uk. Guardian Media Group, 12 July 2007. Web. 11 October 2007.
