= Cuba Solidarity Campaign =

British organisation against US interference in Cuba

- Abbreviation: CSC
- Formation: 1962
- Type: NGO
- Purpose: humanitarian
- Headquarters: 33-37 Moreland Street, London, EC1V 8BB, United Kingdom
- Website: https://www.cuba-solidarity.org.uk

The Cuba Solidarity Campaign is a British organisation founded in 1962 that campaigns against the US embargo of Cuba, for an end to the US occupation of Cuban land at Guantánamo Bay, and against foreign intervention in Cuba.

== Activities ==
The Campaign operates travel tours to Cuba.

== Supporters ==
Jeremy Corbyn, Labour MP for Islington North and Leader of the Labour Party from 2015 to 2020, is a long-time supporter of the Cuba Solidarity Campaign.

Other supporters include:

- Richard Burgon, Labour MP for Leeds East (2015–)
- Grahame Morris, Labour MP for Easington (2010–)
- Paul Maskey, Sinn Féin MP for Belfast West (2011–)
- Father Geoff Bottoms, Catholic Priest
- Maxine Peake, Actor
- Andy de la Tour, actor
- Chris Williamson, Labour MP for Derby North (2010–15, 2017–19)
- Cathy Jamieson, Labour MP for Kilmarnock and Loudoun (2010–15)
- Ken Livingstone, Former Labour mayor of London

== Affiliates ==
The following trade unions are affiliated to the campaign:

- Associated Society of Locomotive Engineers and Firemen
- Broadcasting, Entertainment, Cinematograph and Theatre Union
- Bakers, Food and Allied Workers Union
- Chartered Society of Physiotherapy
- Communication Workers Union
- Fire Brigades Union
- GMB Union
- Musicians' Union
- NAPO
- National Union of Journalists
- National Union of Mineworkers
- National Education Union
- Public and Commercial Services Union
- Prison Officers Association
- National Union of Rail, Maritime and Transport Workers
- Transport Salaried Staffs' Association
- Trades Union Congress
- University and College Union
- UNISON
- Unite the Union

== See also ==
- Norwegian Cuba Association
