= Official culture =

Marxist term for culture receiving social legitimation in society

Official culture is a term used in Marxist circles for the culture that they consider is receiving social legitimation or institutional support in a given society. According to Marxists, "official culture" is usually identified with bourgeoisie culture. For French Marxist theorist Guy Debord, official culture is a "rigged game", where "conservative powers" forbid subversive ideas to have direct access to the public discourse, and where such ideas are integrated only after being trivialized, and sterilized.

Proponents state that a widespread observation is that a great talent has a free spirit. For instance Pushkin, regarded by some scholars as Russia's first great writer, infuriated Russian officialdom and particularly the Tsar, since

instead of being a good servant of the state in the rank and file of the administration and extolling conventional virtues in his vocational writings (if write he must), composed extremely arrogant and extremely independent and extremely wicked verse in which a dangerous freedom of thought was evident in the novelty of his versification, in the audacity of his sensual fancy, and in his propensity for making fun of major and minor tyrants.

== See also ==
- The arts and politics
- Doxology
- High culture
- Popular culture
