= Criticism of United States foreign policy =

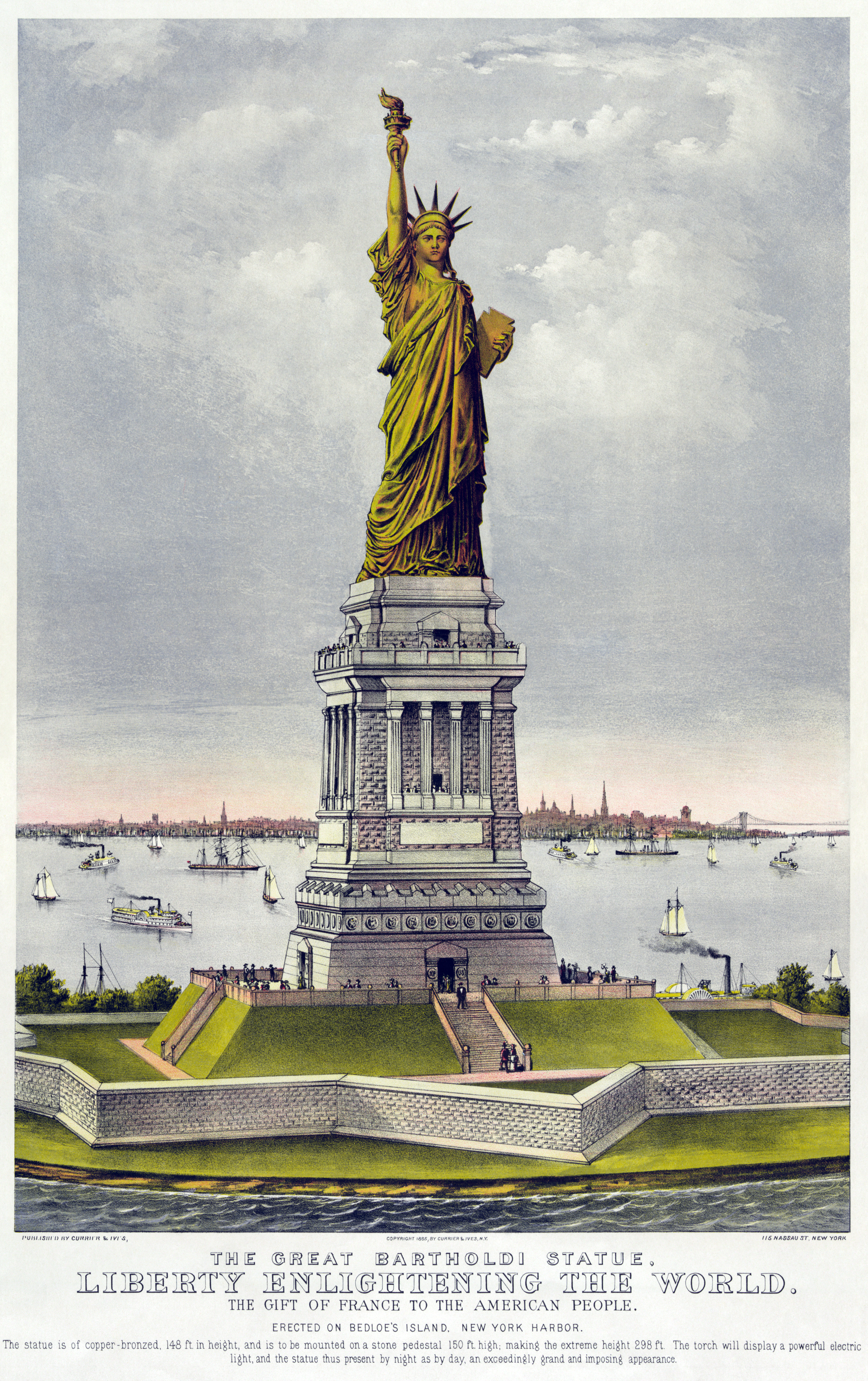
Statue of Liberty in New York Harbor

Criticism of United States foreign policy encompasses a wide range of opinions and views on the perceived failures and shortcomings of American foreign policy and actions. Some Americans view the country as qualitatively different from other nations and believe it cannot be judged by the same standards as other countries; this belief is sometimes termed American exceptionalism. This belief was particularly prevalent in the 20th century. It became less dominant in the 21st century as the country has become more divided politically and has made highly controversial foreign policy decisions such as the Iraq War, its support for Israel in the Gaza war and 2026 Iran war. Nevertheless, the United States is still generally considered a world superpower from an economic, military, and political point-of-view, and it has, in an unspecified number, disregarded international norms, rules, and laws in its foreign policy.

== American exceptionalism and isolationism ==
Critics of American exceptionalism drew parallels with such historic doctrines as civilizing mission and white man's burden which were employed by European Great Powers to justify their colonial conquests.

In his World Policy Journal review of Bill Kauffman's 1995 book America First! Its History, Culture, and Politics, Benjamin Schwarz described America's isolationism as a "tragedy" and being rooted in Puritan thinking.

== Historical foreign policy ==
=== 18th and 19th centuries ===
From its founding, many of the leaders of the young American government had hoped for a non-interventionist foreign policy that promoted "commerce with all nations, alliance with none". However, this goal quickly became increasingly difficult to pursue, with growing implicit threats and non-military pressure faced from several powers, most notably Great Britain. The United States government was drawn into several foreign affairs from its founding and has been criticized throughout history for many of its actions, although in many of these examples it has also been praised.

==== Revolutionary France ====
After the American Revolution, the United States immediately began juggling its foreign policy between many different views under the George Washington cabinet. Most notably, the rivalry between Thomas Jefferson and Alexander Hamilton arose due to their opposing views on how the United States should align itself with Revolutionary France in its war against Great Britain in 1793. Jefferson and the Democratic-Republican Party, who viewed the French revolution as similar to the previous American revolution, believed the United States should declare war on the Kingdom of Great Britain as an ally of France, citing the 1778 Franco-American alliance which was still technically in effect. However, Hamilton and the Federalist Party desired favorable terms with the Bank of England in the hopes of establishing enough credit with the Crown to establish an American national banking system. Hamilton's camp would take the day and influenced Washington to remain neutral during the conflict, destroying relations with France.

Under the presidency of John Adams an undeclared naval war broke out from 1798 until 1799 against France, often called the Quasi War, in part because of the soured relations between the two nations. In addition, the United States would come under the influence of British banking power and regulations, heightening tensions between Democratic-Republicans and Federalists.

==== Relations with Native Americans ====
While U.S. relations with the many Native American nations changed routinely throughout history, the U.S. has been criticized in general for its historical treatment of Native Americans. For example, the treatment of the Cherokee people in the Trail of Tears in which hundreds of Native Americans died in a forced evacuation from their homes in the southeastern area, along with massacres, displacement of lands, swindles, and breaking treaties.

After a long period of respect for sovereignty, United States policy for Native American territories shifted significantly again after the American Civil War. Previously, the pro-State Rights government believed in the legitimacy of Native American Nations' sovereignty. After the conclusion of the Civil War, conversely, views on the sovereignty of Native American nations diminished, as the United States government vested greater powers within the federal government. Over time, the U.S. government found more and more justifications for revoking Native American lands, greatly reducing the size of sovereign native territory.

==== Mexican–American War ====
The U.S. government has been criticized, even in its time, for the beginning and violence of the war with Mexico in the late 1840s. Multiple Whig leaders, led by former president John Quincy Adams, accused incumbent James K. Polk of running a deceitful policy against the Mexicans.

=== 20th century ===
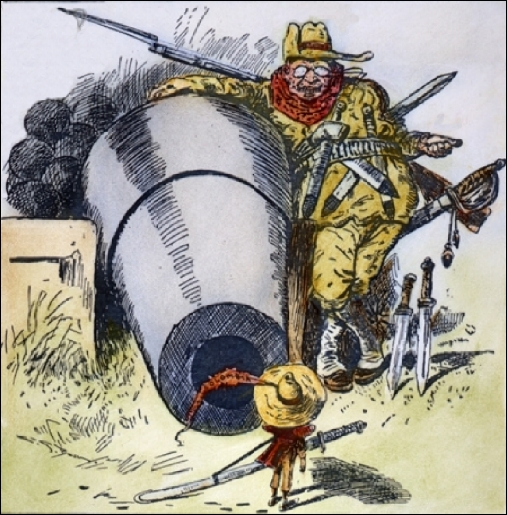
1903 cartoon: "Go Away, Little Man, and Don't Bother Me". President Roosevelt intimidating Colombia to acquire the Panama Canal Zone.

Generally during the 19th century, and in early parts of the 20th century, the U.S. pursued a policy of isolationism and generally avoided entanglements with European powers.

==== Middle East ====
While it may be the case that the Middle East is a difficult region with no easy solutions to avoiding conflict, since this volatile region is at the junction of three continents; still, many analysts think U.S. policy could have been improved substantially. The U.S. waffled; there was no vision; presidents kept changing policy. Public opinion in different regions of the world thinks that, to some extent, the 9/11 attacks were an outgrowth of substandard U.S. policy towards the region.

==== Korea ====
Candidate Dwight D. Eisenhower centered his 1952 presidential campaign on foreign policy, criticizing President Harry S Truman for mishandling the Korean War.

==== Vietnam ====
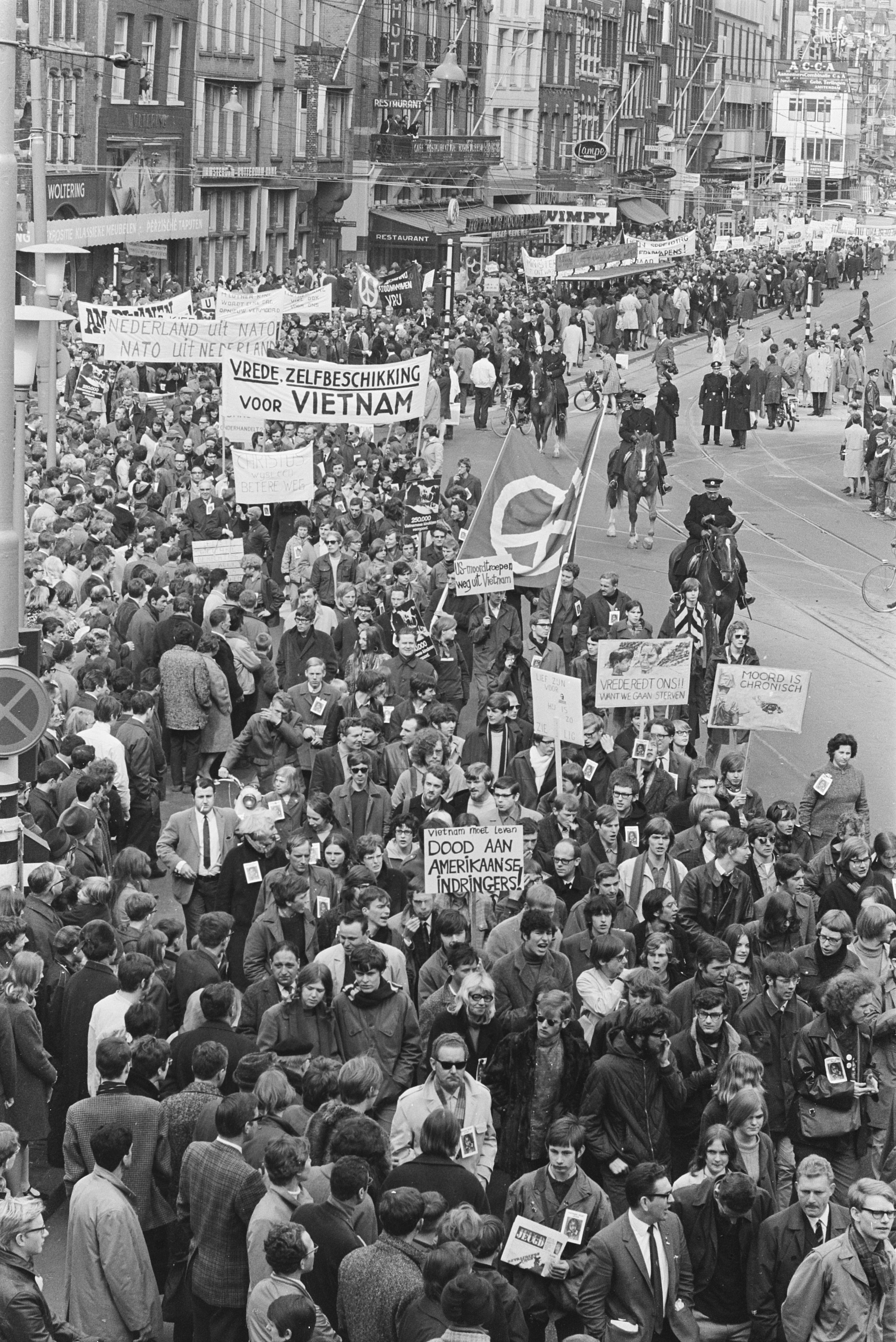
Protest against the Vietnam War, Amsterdam, April 1968

The Vietnam War has been called a decade-long mistake by many, both inside and outside the U.S.

==== Kosovo ====
The U.S. supported action against the rump state known as the Federal Republic of Yugoslavia (also known as Serbia and Montenegro) in 1999 and the secession of Kosovo from Serbia in 2008. The U.S. has continued to support its independence since then. Critics claim this policy breaks international treaties but they have been dismissed by the U.S. These critics say the Kosovo policy has given encouragement to secessionist uprisings in Spain, Belgium, Georgia, Ukraine, China, and others. They also claim that it gives precedent for other lawful successions that would be otherwise illegal because they represent a breach of UN Security Council Resolutions and treaties guaranteeing territorial integrity.

However, the U.S. has dismissed any similarities between those secessionist movements and Kosovo as most other secessionist movements are not facing multiple civil wars involving ethnic cleansing and genocide campaigns that require international intervention. Additionally, some do not accept that the Federal Republic of Yugoslavia was the only legitimate successor state to the Socialist Federal Republic of Yugoslavia (SFRY) after its breakup. The SFRY was the actual party guaranteed territorial integrity under the treaties, not just Serbia and Montenegro.

== Issues ==
=== Lack of control over foreign policy ===
During the early 19th century, general Andrew Jackson exceeded his authority on numerous occasions and attacked American Indian tribes as well as invaded the Spanish territory of Florida without official government permission. Jackson was not reprimanded or punished for exceeding his authority. Some accounts blame newspaper journalism called yellow journalism for whipping up virulent pro-war sentiment to help instigate the Spanish–American War. This was not the only undeclared war the U.S. has fought. There have been hundreds of "imperfect wars" fought without proper declarations in a tradition that began with President George Washington.

Some critics suggest foreign policy is manipulated by lobbies, such as the pro-Israel lobby or the Arab one, although there is disagreement about the influence of such lobbies. Nevertheless, Zbigniew Brzezinski argues for stricter anti-lobbying laws.

=== Financial interests and foreign policy ===
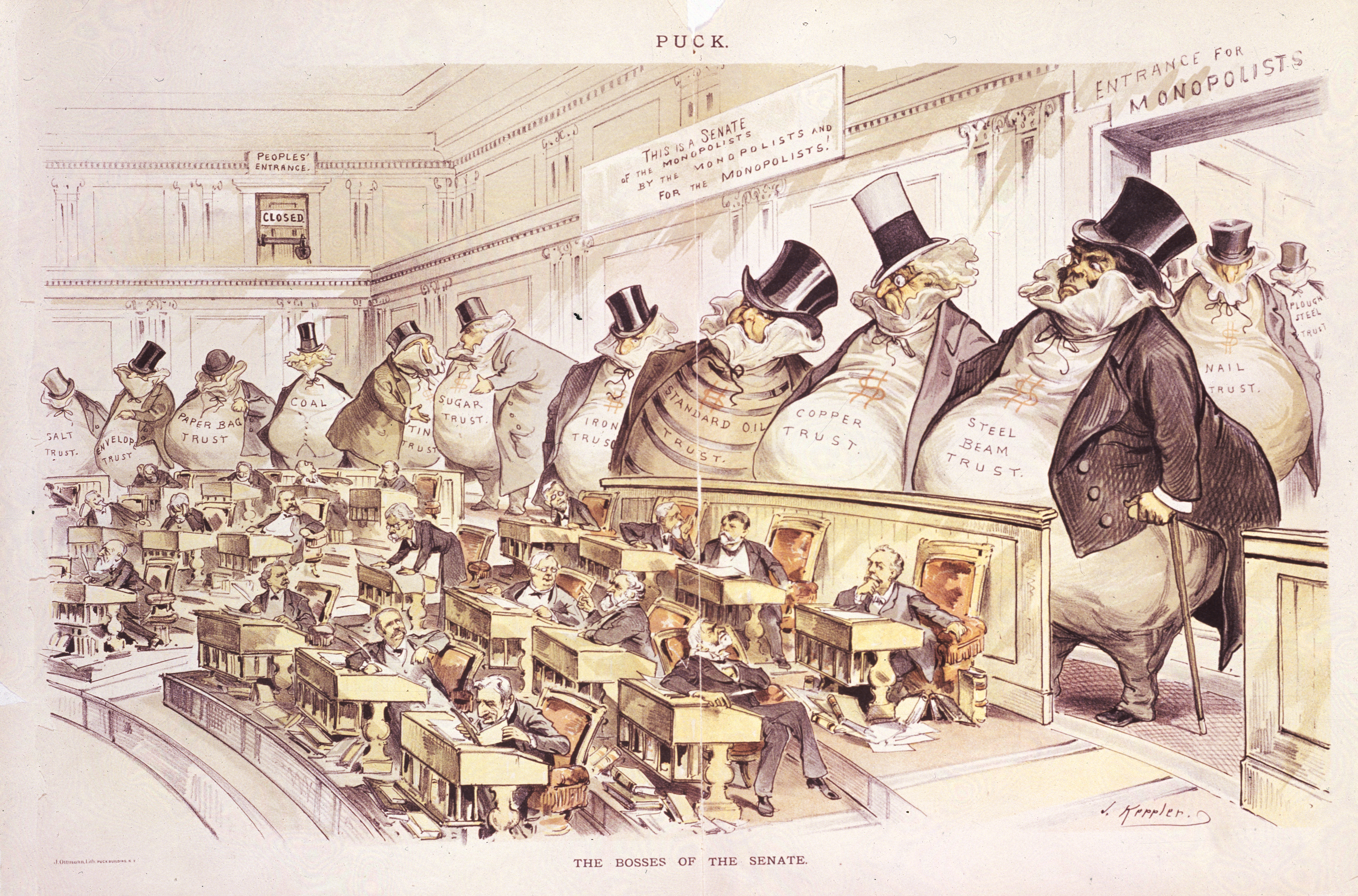
A famous cartoon by Joseph Keppler, 1889, depicting the role of corporate interests in Congress

Some historians, including Andrew Bacevich, suggest that U.S. foreign policy is directed by "wealthy individuals and institutions". In 1893, a decision to back a plot to overthrow the Kingdom of Hawaii by President Benjamin Harrison was clearly motivated by business interests; it was an effort to prevent a proposed tariff increase on sugar. As a result, Hawaii became a U.S. state. There were allegations that the Spanish–American War in 1898 was motivated mainly by business interests in Cuba.

During the first half of the 20th century the United States became engaged in a series of local conflicts in Latin America, which went into history as banana wars. The main purpose of these wars were to defend American commercial interests in the region. Later, U.S. Marine Corps Major General Smedley Butler famously wrote, "I spent 33 years and four months in active military service and during that period I spent most of my time as a high class muscle man for Big Business, for Wall Street and the bankers. In short, I was a racketeer, a gangster for capitalism."

Some critics assert the U.S. decision to support the separatists in Colombia in 1903 was motivated largely by business interests centered on Panama Canal despite declarations that it aimed to "spread democracy" and "end oppression". One can say that U.S. foreign policy does reflect the will of the people, however people might have a consumerist mentality, which justifies wars in their minds.

There are allegations that decisions to go to war in Iraq were motivated at least partially by oil interests; for example, British newspaper The Independent reported that the "Bush administration is heavily involved in writing Iraq's oil law" which would "allow Western oil companies contracts to pump oil out of Iraq up to 30 years, and the profits would be tax-free." Whether motivated by it or not, U.S. foreign policy in the Middle East appears to much of the world as to be motivated by an oil rationale.

=== Allegations of imperialism and neocolonialism ===
There is a growing consensus among American historians and political scientists that the United States during the American Century grew into an empire resembling ancient Rome in many ways. Currently, there is a debate over implications of imperial tendencies of U.S. foreign policy on democracy and social order.

In 2002, conservative political commentator Charles Krauthammer declared cultural, economical, technological and military superiority of the U.S. in the world a given fact. In his opinion, people were "coming out of the closet on the word empire". More prominently, the New York Times Magazine cover for January 5, 2003, featured a slogan "American Empire: Get Used To It". Inside, a Canadian author Michael Ignatieff characterized the American imperial power as an empire lite.

According to Newsweek reporter Fareed Zakaria, the Washington establishment has "gotten comfortable with the exercise of American hegemony and treats compromise as treason and negotiations as appeasement", and added, "This is not foreign policy; it's imperial policy."

Emily Eakin reflecting the intellectual trends of the time, summarized in The New York Times that, "America is no mere superpower or hegemon but a full-blown empire in the Roman and British sense. That, at any rate, is the consensus of some of the nation's most notable commentators and scholars."

Many allies of the U.S. were critical of a new, unilateral sensibility tone in its foreign policy, and showed displeasure by voting, for example, against the U.S. in the United Nations in 2001.

=== Allegations of hypocrisy ===
The U.S. has been criticized for making statements supporting peace and respecting national sovereignty while carrying out military actions such as in Grenada, fomenting a civil war in Colombia to break off Panama, and Iraq. The U.S. has been criticized for advocating free trade while protecting local industries with import tariffs on foreign goods such as lumber and agricultural products. The U.S. has also been criticized for advocating concern for human rights while refusing to ratify the Convention on the Rights of the Child. The U.S. has publicly stated that it is opposed to torture, but has been criticized for condoning it in the School of the Americas. The U.S. has advocated a respect for national sovereignty but has supported internal guerrilla movements and paramilitary organizations, such as the Contras in Nicaragua. They have also supported the unilateral independence of Kosovo (see here) while also condemning other countries for unilateral independence, citing territorial integrity (Abkhazia, Crimea). The U.S. has been criticized for voicing concern about narcotics production in countries such as Bolivia and Venezuela but does not follow through on cutting certain bilateral aid programs. The U.S. has been criticized for not maintaining a consistent policy; it has been accused of denouncing alleged rights violations in China while supporting alleged human rights abuses by Israel.

However, some defenders argue that a policy of rhetoric while doing things counter to the rhetoric was necessary in the sense of realpolitik and helped secure victory against the dangers of tyranny and totalitarianism.

=== Support of dictatorships and state terrorism ===
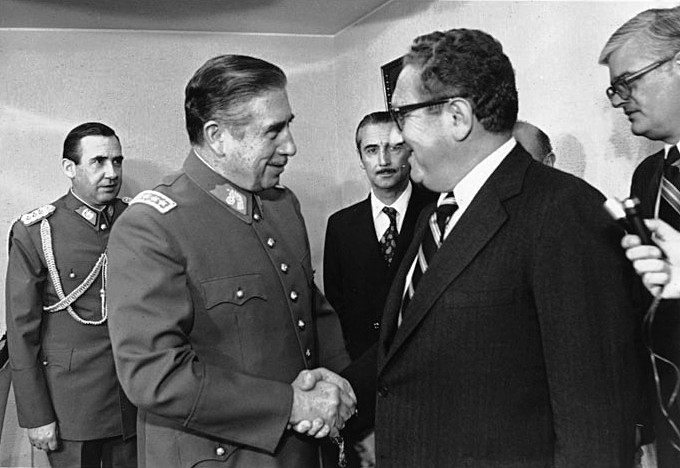
Chilean leader Augusto Pinochet shaking hands with Henry Kissinger in 1976

The U.S. has been criticized for supporting dictatorships with economic assistance and military hardware. Particular dictatorships have included the Shah of Iran, Ferdinand Marcos of the Philippines, Somoza dynasty of Nicaragua, Fulgencio Batista of Cuba, Mobutu Sese Seko of Zaire, Emperor Haile Selassie of Ethiopia, Pervez Musharraf of Pakistan, Yoweri Museveni of Uganda, warlords in Somalia, Augusto Pinochet in Chile, Alfredo Stroessner of Paraguay, Carlos Castillo Armas and Efraín Ríos Montt of Guatemala, Jorge Rafael Videla of Argentina, Suharto of Indonesia, and Hissène Habré of Chad.

Ruth J Blakeley and Vincent Bevins posit that the United States and its allies sponsored and facilitated state terrorism and mass killings on a significant scale during the Cold War. The justification given for this was to contain Communism, but Blakeley says it was also a means by which to buttress the interests of US business elites and to promote the expansion of capitalism and neoliberalism in the Global South.

J. Patrice McSherry, a professor of political science at Long Island University, states that "hundreds of thousands of Latin Americans were tortured, abducted or killed by right-wing military regimes as part of the US-led anti-communist crusade", which included US support for Operation Condor and the Guatemalan military during the Guatemalan Civil War. According to Latin Americanist John Henry Coatsworth, the number of repression victims in Latin America alone far surpassed that of the Soviet Union and its East European satellites during the period 1960 to 1990. Mark Aarons asserts that the atrocities carried out by Western-backed dictatorships rival those of the communist world.

Contemporary research and declassified documents demonstrate that the US and some of its Western allies directly facilitated and encouraged the mass murder of hundreds of thousands of suspected Communists in Indonesia during the mid-1960s. Bradley Simpson, Director of the Indonesia/East Timor Documentation Project at the National Security Archive, says "Washington did everything in its power to encourage and facilitate the army-led massacre of alleged Communist Party of Indonesia members, and U.S. officials worried only that the killing of the party's unarmed supporters might not go far enough, permitting Sukarno to return to power and frustrate the [Johnson] Administration's emerging plans for a post-Sukarno Indonesia." According to Simpson, the terror in Indonesia was an "essential building block of the quasi neo-liberal policies the West would attempt to impose on Indonesia in the years to come". Historian John Roosa, commenting on documents released from the US embassy in Jakarta in 2017, says they confirm that "the U.S. was part and parcel of the operation, strategizing with the Indonesian army and encouraging them to go after the PKI." Geoffrey B. Robinson, historian at UCLA, argues that without the support of the U.S. and other powerful Western states, the Indonesian Army's program of mass killings would not have occurred. Vincent Bevins writes the mass killings in Indonesia served as the apex of a loose network of US-backed anti-communist mass killing campaigns in the Global South during the Cold War.

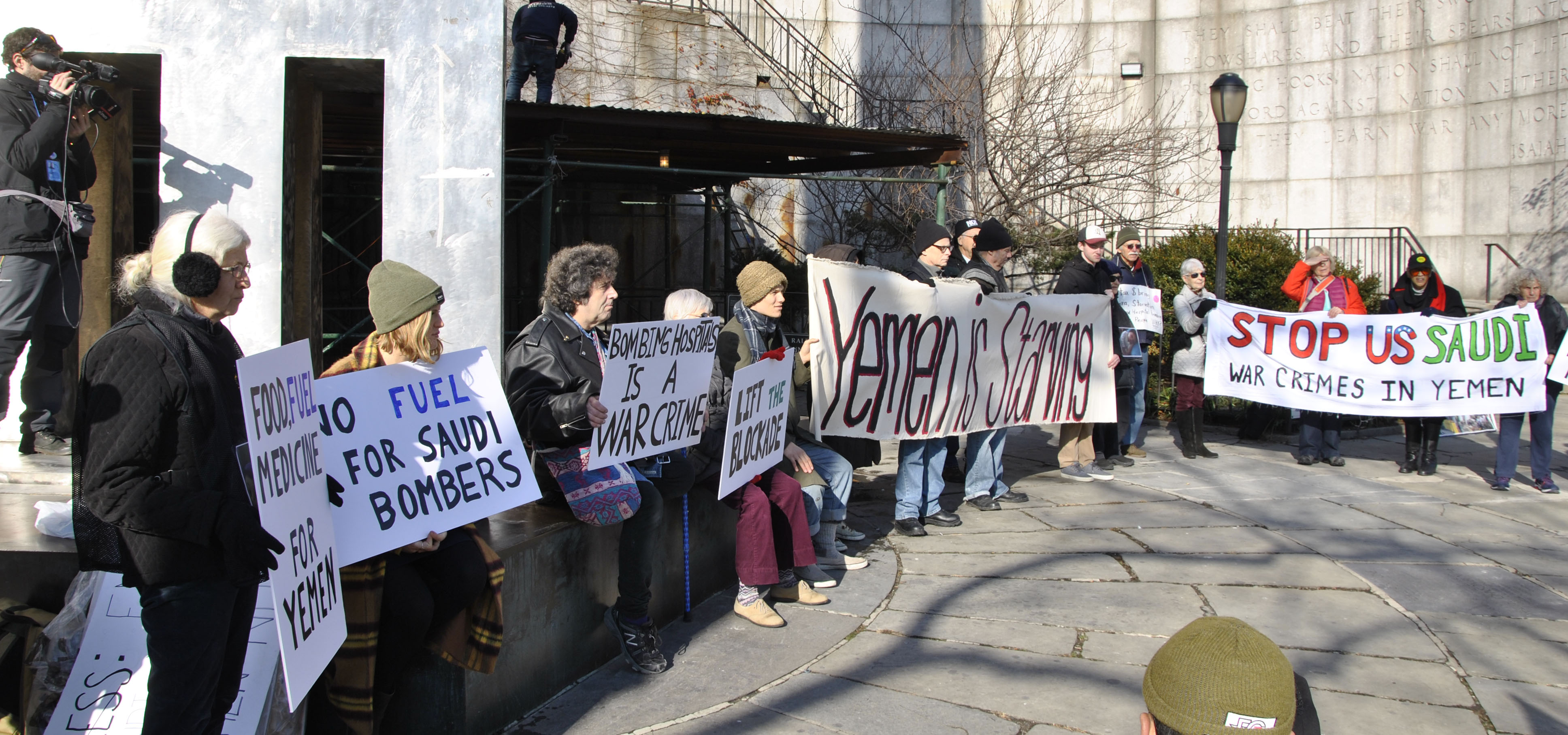
Protest against U.S. involvement in the military intervention in Yemen, New York City, 2017

According to journalist Glenn Greenwald, the strategic rationale for U.S. support of brutal and even genocidal dictatorships around the globe has been consistent since the end of World War II: "In a world where anti-American sentiment is prevalent, democracy often produces leaders who impede rather than serve U.S. interests ... None of this is remotely controversial or even debatable. U.S. support for tyrants has largely been conducted out in the open, and has been expressly defended and affirmed for decades by the most mainstream and influential U.S. policy experts and media outlets."

The U.S. has been accused of complicity in war crimes for backing the Saudi Arabian-led intervention in Yemen, which has triggered a humanitarian catastrophe, including a cholera outbreak and millions facing starvation. Many of Saudi Arabia's airstrikes on Yemen have relied on U.S. support.

After International Criminal Court issued arrest warrants for Israeli Prime Minister Benjamin Netanyahu and his former defense minister, Yoav Gallant, over suspected war crimes in Gaza, American politicians have threatened to impose sanctions on officials at the ICC.

=== Sanctions ===
Numerous US unilateral sanctions against various countries around the world have been criticized by different commentators. Since 1998 the United States has imposed economic sanctions on more than 20 countries.

These sanctions, according to Daniel T. Griswold, failed to change the behavior of sanctioned countries; but they have barred American companies from economic opportunities, and harmed the poorest people in the countries under sanctions. Secondary sanctions, (Note: Secondary US sanctions prohibit any trading in US dollars and prevent trade with a country, individuals or organizations under the US sanctions regime.) according to Rawi Abdelal, often separate the United States and Europe because they reflect US interference in the affairs and interests of the European Union. Since Trump became the president of the United States, Abdelal believes, sanctions have been seen not only as an expression of Washington's preferences and whims, but also as a tool for US economic warfare that has angered historical allies such as the European Union.

=== Interference in internal affairs ===
The United States was criticized for manipulating the internal affairs of foreign nations, including Ukraine, Guatemala, Chile, Cuba, Colombia, and various countries in Africa, including Uganda.

One study indicated that the country most often intervening in foreign elections is the United States with 81 interventions from 1946 to 2000.

=== Promotion of democracy ===
Some critics argue that America's policy of advocating democracy may be ineffective and even counterproductive. Zbigniew Brzezinski declared that "[t]he coming to power of Hamas is a very good example of excessive pressure for democratization" and argued that George W. Bush's attempts to use democracy as an instrument against terrorism were risky and dangerous.

Analyst Jessica Tuchman Mathews of the Carnegie Endowment for International Peace agreed that imposing democracy "from scratch" was unwise, and did not work. Realist critics such as George F. Kennan argued U.S. responsibility is only to protect its own citizens and that Washington should deal with other governments on that basis alone; they criticize president Woodrow Wilson's emphasis on democratization and nation-building although it was not mentioned in Wilson's Fourteen Points, and the failure of the League of Nations to enforce international will regarding Nazi Germany, Fascist Italy, and Imperial Japan in the 1930s. Realist critics attacked the idealism of Wilson as being ill-suited for weak states created at the Paris Peace Conference. Others, however, criticize the U.S. Senate's decision not to join the League of Nations which was based on isolationist public sentiment as being one cause for the organization's ineffectiveness.

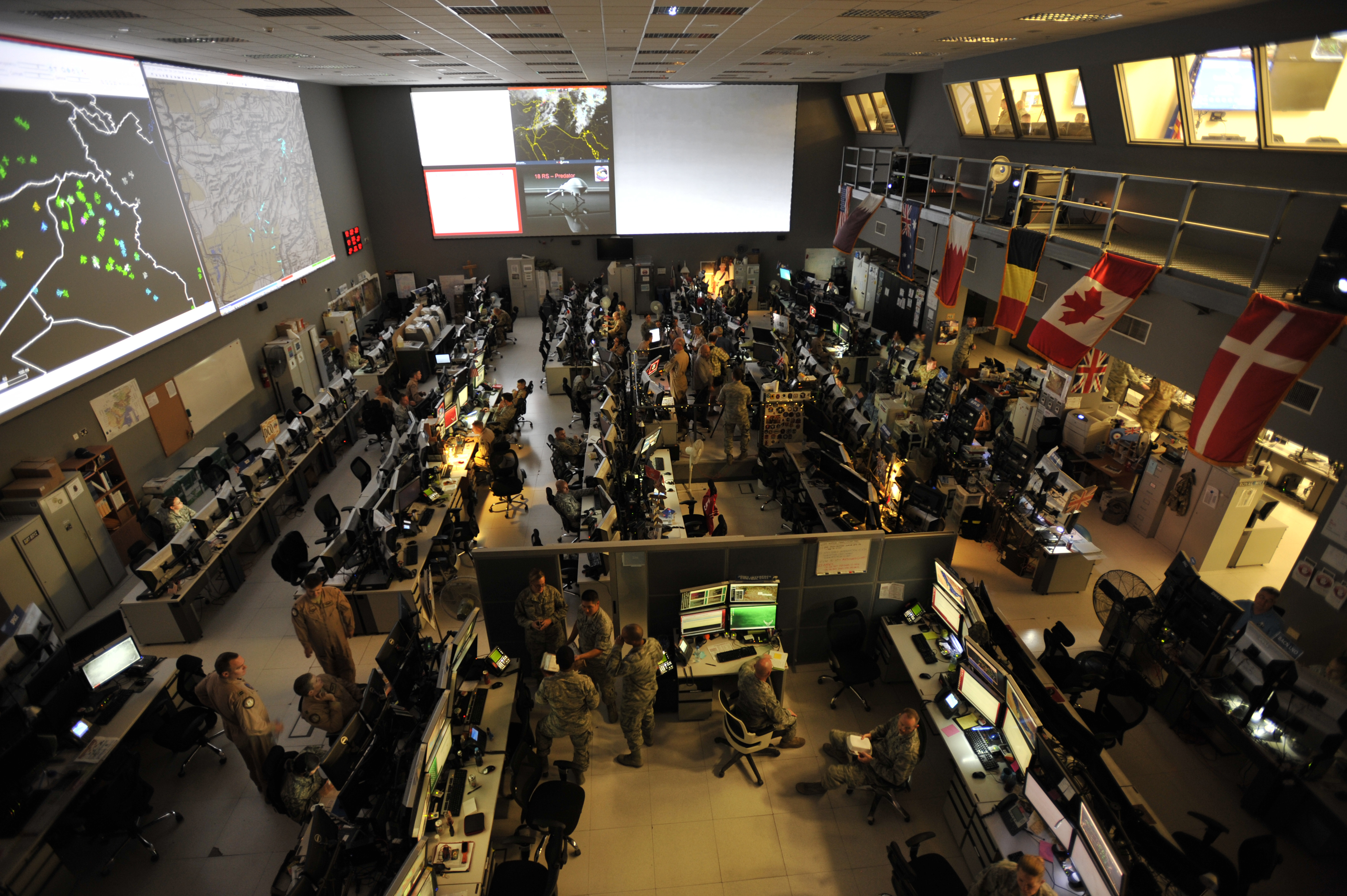
Combined Air and Space Operations Center at Al Udeid Air Base in Qatar

According to The Huffington Post, "The 45 nations and territories with little or no democratic rule represent more than half of the roughly 80 countries now hosting U.S. bases. ... Research by political scientist Kent Calder confirms what's come to be known as the 'dictatorship hypothesis': The United States tends to support dictators [and other undemocratic regimes] in nations where it enjoys basing facilities."

=== Human rights problems ===
President George W. Bush has been criticized for neglecting democracy and human rights by focusing exclusively on an effort to fight terrorism. The U.S. was criticized for alleged prisoner abuse at Guantánamo Bay, Abu Ghraib in Iraq, and secret CIA prisons in eastern Europe, according to Amnesty International. In response, the U.S. government claimed incidents of abuse were isolated incidents which did not reflect U.S. policy.

In May 2023, The New York Times reported that declassified documents confirm that, regarding irregular warfare, US Special Operations forces "are not required to vet for past human rights violations by the foreign troops they arm and train as surrogates." The report notes that while there is no vetting of these foreign troops for crimes including "rape, torture or extrajudicial killings," potential candidates are vetted for political views that might make them a threat to U.S. forces, with "phone call logs, travel histories, social media posts, and social contacts" being thoroughly screened.

In September 2025, the US State Department sanctioned three Palestinian human rights groups that asked the International Criminal Court to investigate allegations of Israel's war crimes in Gaza war. Marco Rubio said the US would sanction NGOs "Al Haq, Al Mezan Center for Human Rights (Al Mezan), and the Palestinian Centre for Human Rights (PCHR)" for engaging in "illegitimate targeting of Israel."

=== Militarism ===
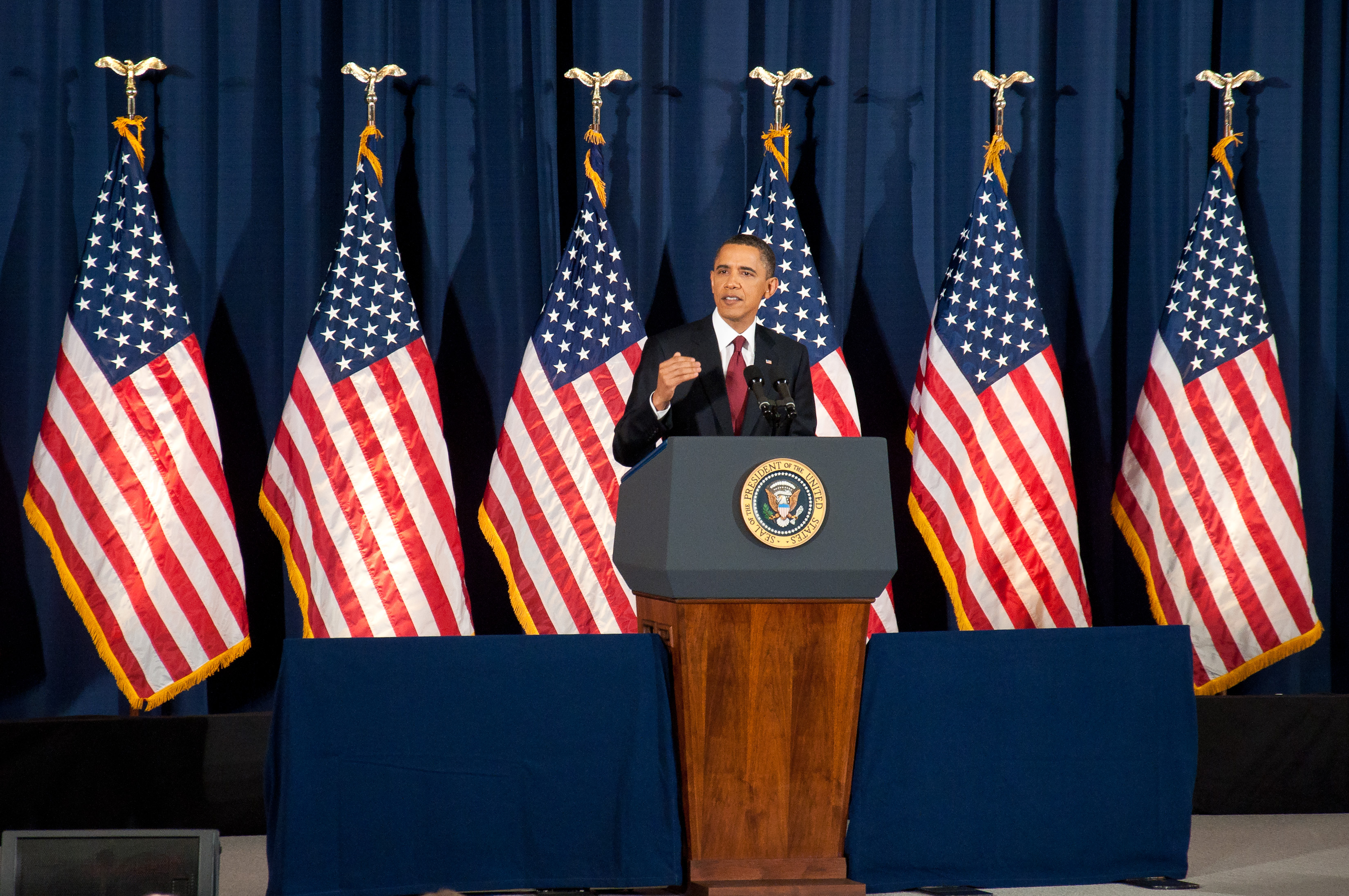
President Barack Obama speaking on the military intervention in Libya at the National Defense University, March 2011

In the 1960s, Martin Luther King Jr. criticized excessive U.S. spending on military projects, and suggested a linkage between its foreign policy abroad and racism at home. In 1971, a Time essayist noted 375 major and 3,000 lesser U.S. military facilities worldwide and concluded that "there is no question that the U.S. today has too many troops scattered about in too many places."

Expenditures to fight the war on terror are vast. The Iraq war, lasting from 2003 to 2011, was especially costly. In a 2010 defense report, Anthony Cordesman criticized out-of-control military spending. The wars in Afghanistan, Iraq, Syria and Pakistan have, from their beginning in 2001 through the end of the 2019 fiscal year, cost American taxpayers $6.4 trillion.

Andrew Bacevich argues that the U.S. has a tendency to resort to military means to try to solve diplomatic problems. The U.S. involvement in the Vietnam War was a $111 billion, decade-long military engagement which ended in a military victory but strategic defeat due to the public's loss of support for the war.

Radhika Desai, director of the Geopolitical Economy Research Group at the University of Manitoba, states that when the Soviet Union existed it was "critical in defeating and deterring US military action and confining it to proxy wars" and that only after the breakup of the Socialist Bloc "did the United States shift to ever more unilateral military aggression," citing the war on terror, the Iraq War, and the wars in Yugoslavia, Libya and Syria as examples.

=== Violation of international law ===
The U.S. does not always follow international law. For example, some critics assert the U.S.-led invasion of Iraq was not a proper response to an imminent threat, but an act of aggression which violated international law. For example, Benjamin Ferencz, a chief prosecutor of Nazi war crimes at Nuremberg said George W. Bush should be tried for war crimes along with Saddam Hussein for starting aggressive wars—Saddam for his 1990 attack on Kuwait and Bush for his 2003 invasion of Iraq.

Critics point out that the United Nations Charter, ratified by the U.S., prohibits members from using force against fellow members except against imminent attack or pursuant to an explicit Security Council authorization. A professor of international law asserted there was no authorization from the UN Security Council which made the invasion "a crime against the peace". However, U.S. defenders argue there was such an authorization according to UN Security Council Resolution 1441. The U.S. has also supported Kosovo's independence even though it is strictly written in UN Security Council Resolution 1244 that Kosovo cannot be independent and it is stated as a Serbian province. However the International Court of Justice ruled the declaration of independence was legal because the Security Council Resolution did not specify the final status of Kosovo. The U.S. has actively supported and pressured other countries to recognize Kosovo's independence.

=== Manipulation of U.S. foreign policy ===
Some political scientists maintained that setting economic interdependence as a foreign policy goal may have exposed the United States to manipulation. As a result, the U.S. trading partners gained an ability to influence the U.S. foreign policy decision-making process by manipulating, for example, the currency exchange rate, or restricting the flow of goods and raw materials. In addition, more than 40% of the U.S. foreign debt is currently owned by the big institutional investors from overseas, who continue to accumulate the Treasury bonds. A reporter for The Washington Post wrote that "several less-than-democratic African leaders have skillfully played the anti-terrorism card to earn a relationship with the United States that has helped keep them in power", and suggested, in effect, that therefore foreign dictators could manipulate U.S. foreign policy for their own benefit. It is also possible for foreign governments to channel money through political action committees to buy influence in Congress.

=== Commitment to foreign aid ===
Some critics charge that U.S. government aid should be higher given the high levels of gross domestic product. They claim other countries give more money on a per capita basis, including both government and charitable contributions. By one index which ranked charitable giving as a percentage of GDP, the U.S. ranked 21 of 22 OECD countries by giving 0.17% of GDP to overseas aid, and compared the U.S. to Sweden which gave 1.03% of its GDP, according to different estimates. The U.S. pledged 0.7% of GDP at a global conference in Mexico. According to one estimate, U.S. overseas aid fell 16% from 2005 to 2006.

However, since the U.S. grants tax breaks to nonprofits, it subsidizes relief efforts abroad, although other nations also subsidize charitable activity abroad. Most foreign aid (79%) came not from government sources but from private foundations, corporations, voluntary organizations, universities, religious organizations and individuals. According to the Index of Global Philanthropy, the United States is the top donor in absolute amounts.

=== Environmental policy ===
The U.S. has been criticized for failure to support the 1997 Kyoto Protocol.

=== The Holocaust ===
There has been sharp criticism about the U.S. response to the Holocaust: That it failed to admit Jews fleeing persecution from Europe at the beginning of World War II, and that it did not act decisively enough to prevent or stop the Holocaust. Franklin D. Roosevelt, who was the President at the time, was well-informed about the Hitler regime and its anti-Jewish policies, but the U.S. State Department policies made it very difficult for Jewish refugees to obtain entry visas. Roosevelt similarly took no action on the Wagner–Rogers Bill, which could have saved 20,000 Jewish refugee children, following the arrival of 936 Jewish refugees on the MS St. Louis, who were denied asylum and were not allowed into the United States because of strict laws passed by Congress.

During the era, the American press did not always publicize reports of Nazi atrocities in full or with prominent placement. By 1942, after newspapers began to report details of the Holocaust, articles were extremely short and were buried deep in the newspaper. These reports were either denied or unconfirmed by the United States government. When it did receive irrefutable evidence that the reports were true (and photographs of mass graves and murder in Birkenau camp in 1943, with victims moving into the gas chambers), U.S. officials suppressed the information and classified it as secret. It is possible lives of European Jews could have been saved.

=== Alienation of allies ===
There is evidence that many U.S. allies have been alienated by a unilateral approach. Allies signaled dissatisfaction with U.S. policy in a vote at the U.N.

=== Ineffective public relations ===
One report suggests that news source Al-jazeera routinely paints the U.S. as evil throughout the Middle East. Other critics have faulted the U.S. public relations effort. As a result of faulty policy and lackluster public relations, the U.S. has a severe image problem in the Middle East, according to Anthony Cordesman.

Analyst Jessica Tuchman Mathews writes that it appears to much of the Arab world that the United States went to war in Iraq for oil, regardless of the accuracy of that motive. In a 2007 poll by BBC News asking which countries are seen as having a "negative influence in the world", the survey found that Iran, United States and North Korea had the most negative influence, while nations such as Canada, Japan and those in the European Union had the most positive influence. The U.S. has been accused by some U.N. officials of condoning actions by Israel against Palestinians. On the other hand, others have accused the U.S. of being too supportive of the Palestinians.

=== Ineffective prosecution of war ===
One estimate is that the second Iraq War along with the so-called war on terror cost $551 billion, or $597 billion in 2009 dollars. Boston University professor Andrew Bacevich has criticized American profligacy and squandering its wealth.

There have been criticisms of U.S. warmaking failures. In the War of 1812, the U.S. was unable to conquer British North America (modern-day Canada) despite several attempts. The Vietnam War (1955-1975) and the War in Afghanistan (2001–2021) both resulted in enemy forces taking over the governments of those countries, despite many years of warfighting to prevent that.

Some critics point to American disregard for civilian casualties as counterproductive, generating pervasive anti-Americanism in affected countries, recruiting enemy fighters and terrorists.

=== Ineffective strategy against terrorism ===
The U.S. practice of extrajudicial targeted killing by combat drone has drawn conflicting opinions about whether it is effective in eliminating threats or simply serves to recruit more terrorists due to its perceived injustice and civilian casualties.

Critic Cordesman criticized U.S. strategy to combat terrorism as not having enough emphasis on getting Islamic republics to fight terrorism themselves. Sometimes visitors have been misidentified as "terrorists".

Mathews suggests the risk of nuclear terrorism remains unprevented. In 1999 during the Kosovo War, the U.S. supported the Kosovo Liberation Army (KLA), though it had been recognised as a terrorist organisation by the U.S. some years prior. Right before the 1999 bombing of Yugoslavia took place, the U.S. took down the KLA from the list of internationally recognized terrorist organizations in order to justify their aid and help to the KLA.

American anti-terrorism efforts after September 11, 2001 have been criticized as focusing too much on international Islamic extremism and not enough on domestic terrorism.

=== Small role of Congress in foreign policy ===
Critic Robert McMahon thinks Congress has been excluded from foreign policy decision making, and that this is detrimental. Other writers suggest a need for greater Congressional participation. Jim Webb, former Democratic senator from Virginia and former Secretary of the Navy in the Reagan administration, believes that Congress has an ever-decreasing role in U.S. foreign policy making. September 11, 2001, precipitated this change, where "powers quickly shifted quickly to the Presidency as the call went up for centralized decision making in a traumatized nation where, quick, decisive action was considered necessary. It was considered politically dangerous and even unpatriotic to question this shift, lest one be accused of impeding national safety during a time of war." Since that time, Webb thinks Congress has become largely irrelevant in shaping and executing of U.S. foreign policy. He cites the Strategic Framework Agreement (SFA), the U.S.–Afghanistan Strategic Partnership Agreement, and the 2011 military intervention in Libya as examples of growing legislative irrelevance.

Regarding the SFA, "Congress was not consulted in any meaningful way. Once the document was finalized, Congress was not given the opportunity to debate the merits of the agreement, which was specifically designed to shape the structure of our long-term relations in Iraq" (11). "Congress did not debate or vote on this agreement, which set U.S. policy toward an unstable regime in an unstable region of the world." The Iraqi Parliament, by contrast, voted on the measure twice. The U.S.–Afghanistan Strategic Partnership Agreement is described by the Obama Administration has a "legally binding executive agreement" that outlines the future of U.S.–Afghan relations and designated Afghanistan a major non-NATO ally. "It is difficult to understand how any international agreement negotiated, signed, and authored only by our executive branch of government can be construed as legally binding in our constitutional system", Webb argues. Finally, Webb identifies the U.S. intervention in Libya as a troubling historical precedent. "The issue in play in Libya was not simply whether the president should ask Congress for a declaration of war. Nor was it wholly about whether Obama violated the edicts of the War Powers Act, which in this writer's view he clearly did. The issue that remains to be resolved is whether a president can unilaterally begin, and continue, a military campaign for reasons that he alone defines as meeting the demanding standards of a vital national interest worth of risking American lives and expending billions of dollars of taxpayer money." When the military campaign lasted months, President Barack Obama did not seek approval of Congress to continue military activity.

=== Lack of vision ===
The short-term election cycle coupled with the inability to stay focused on long-term objectives motivates American presidents to lean towards actions that would appease the citizenry, and, as a rule, avoid complicated international issues and difficult choices. Thus, Zbigniew Brzezinski criticized the Clinton presidency as having a foreign policy which lacked "discipline and passion" and subjected the U.S. to "eight years of drift". In comparison, the next, Bush presidency was criticized for many impulsive decisions that harmed the international standing of the U.S. in the world. Former director of operations for the Joint Chiefs of Staff Lt. Gen. Gregory S. Newbold commented that, "There's a broad naïvete in the political class about America's obligations in foreign policy issues, and scary simplicity about the effects that employing American military power can achieve".

=== Allegations of arrogance ===
Some commentators have thought the United States became arrogant, particularly after its victory in World War II. Critics such as Andrew Bacevich call on America to have a foreign policy "rooted in humility and realism". Foreign policy experts such as Zbigniew Brzezinski counsel a policy of self-restraint and not pressing every advantage, and listening to other nations. A government official called the U.S. policy in Iraq "arrogant and stupid", according to one report.

=== Problem areas festering ===
Critics point to a list of countries or regions where continuing foreign policy problems continue to present problems. These areas include South America, including Ecuador, Bolivia, Uruguay, and Brazil. There are difficulties with Central American nations such as Honduras. Iraq has continuing troubles. Iran, as well, presents problems with nuclear proliferation. In Afghanistan, the US 20-year war failed and the country fell into the Taliban regime. The Middle East in general continues to fester, although relations with India are improving. Policy towards Russia remains uncertain. China also presents a challenge. There are difficulties in other regions too. In addition, there are problems not confined to particular regions, but regarding new technologies. Cyberspace is a constantly changing technological area with foreign policy repercussions.

== See also ==
- United States sanctions § Perceptions
- Art, Truth and Politics
- Criticism of the Bush Doctrine
- Criticism of the Iraq War
- Criticism of Plan Colombia
- Criticism of the United States government
- United States atrocity crimes
- United States diplomatic cables leak
- United States support for Israel in the Gaza war
