= Full-spectrum dominance =

Effect of total control in a battlespace

Full-spectrum dominance also known as full-spectrum superiority, is a military entity's achievement of control over all dimensions of the battlespace, effectively possessing an overwhelming diversity of resources in such areas as terrestrial, aerial, maritime, subterranean, extraterrestrial, psychological, and bio- or cyber-technological warfare.

Full spectrum dominance includes the physical battlespace; air, surface and sub-surface as well as the electromagnetic spectrum and information space. Control implies that freedom of opposition force assets to exploit the battlespace is wholly constrained.

== US military doctrine ==
As early as April 2001 the United States Department of Defense defined "full-spectrum superiority" (FSS) as:

The cumulative effect of dominance in the air, land, maritime, and space domains and information environment, which includes cyberspace, that permits the conduct of joint operations without effective opposition or prohibitive interference.

The doctrine of Full Spectrum Operations replaced the prior one, which was known as AirLand Battle. AirLand Battle had been taught in one form or another since 1982.

The United States military's doctrine espoused a strategic intent to be capable of achieving FSS state in a conflict, either alone or with allies, by defeating any adversary and controlling any situation across the range of military operations.

The stated intent implies significant investment in a range of capabilities: dominant maneuver, precision engagement, focused logistics, and full-dimensional protection.

== Criticism ==
Critics of US imperialism have referred to the term as proof of the ambitions of policymakers in the US and their alleged desire for total control. Harold Pinter referred to the term in his 2005 Nobel Prize in Literature acceptance speech Art, Truth and Politics:

I have said earlier that the United States is now totally frank about putting its cards on the table. That is the case. Its official declared policy is now defined as "full spectrum dominance". That is not my term, it is theirs. "Full spectrum dominance" means control of land, sea, air and space and all attendant resources.

== Metaphorical use ==
Full spectrum dominance is used in a number of non-military fields to describe a comprehensive tactical effort to support a strategy.

In marketing, full spectrum dominance may refer to an integrated campaign that takes into account reaching an audience across a wide variety of platforms and media to guarantee visibility and reinforcement. That might include simultaneous integration of online promotions with direct marketing, public relations, social media and other tactical marketing vehicles.

== See also ==
- Geostrategy
- Multi-Domain Operations
- Network-centric warfare
- Overmatch
- Psychological warfare
