= Poet as legislator =

Historical concept

The theme of poet as legislator reached its peak in the Romantic era, epitomised in Shelley's view of poets as the 'unacknowledged legislators of the world'.

However the concept had a long prehistory in Western culture, with classical figures like Orpheus or Solon being appealed to as precedents for the poet's civilising role.

== Classical origins ==
Plato's opposition to poets in his ideal Republic was predicated on the contemporary existence of Homeric expounders who claimed that "a man ought to regulate the tenour of his whole life by this poet's directions". Plato only allowed the already censured poet to guide the young, to be an acknowledged legislator at the price of total external control.

Less threatened by the poetic role, the Romans by contrast saw poetry, with Horace, as primarily pleasing, and only secondarily as instructive.

== Renaissance and Augustan views ==
Building on the view of the fifteenth century Florentine Neoplatonists of the poet as seer, however, Sir Philip Sidney developed a more powerful concept of the poet as overtopping the philosopher, historian and lawyer to stand out as "the monarch...of all sciences.

Such a viewpoint was more or less institutionalised in Augustan literature, Johnson's Rasselas maintaining for example that the poet "must write as the interpreter of nature and the legislator of mankind" – a fully public, even patriotic role moreover

== Romantic peaks ==
By contrast the Romantic view of the poet as unackowledged legislator emerges at the turn of the century in the writing of William Godwin, with his anarchic view of the poet as "the legislator of generations and the moral instructor of the world".

It received its most memorable formulation however in Percy Bysshe Shelley's 1821 "A Defence of Poetry". Shelley maintained that, through their powers of imaginative understanding, 'Poets' (in the widest sense, of ancient Greece) were able to identify and formulate emerging socio-cultural trends; and were as a result "the hierophants of an unapprehended inspiration...the unacknowledged legislators of the world".

== Modernist irony ==
The grand claims of the Romantics began to give way in the twentieth century to a more ironic stance – Yeats speaking for his calling in general when he wrote "We have no gift to set a statesman right".

What remained of the Shelley claim was to be further diminished by Postmodernism's distrust for grand narratives, if not perhaps destroyed entirely.

== See also ==
- Bard
- Christopher Hitchens
- Clerisy
- Mark Akenside
- Matthew Arnold
- Pushkin
- The arts and politics
- Václav Havel
