= 2005 Nobel Prize in Literature =

- Harold Pinter
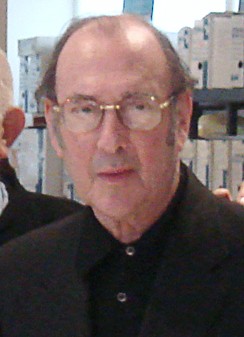
- "who in his plays uncovers the precipice under everyday prattle and forces entry into oppression's closed rooms."
- Date: 13 October 2005 (announcement); 10 December 2005 (ceremony)
- Location: Stockholm, Sweden
- Presented by: Swedish Academy
- First award: 1901
- Website: Official website

The 2005 Nobel Prize in Literature was awarded to the English playwright Harold Pinter (1930–2008) "who in his plays uncovers the precipice under everyday prattle and forces entry into oppression's closed rooms." He is the 11th British writer to become a recipient of the prize after William Golding in 1983 and was followed later by Doris Lessing in 2007 and Kazuo Ishiguro in 2017.

== Laureate ==
Harold Pinter's writing consists primarily of dramas. A recurring theme in his plays is an inability to communicate in relationships, while the dialogue is often clear-cut, the expressions of relationships—balances of power, class and gender divisions—lie beneath the words. His plays sometimes include dark humor and violence that is combined with their unpredictability, making them frightening. Pinter's writing also has a political dimension, inciting revolt against ruling power. His best-known plays include The Birthday Party (1957), The Caretaker (1959), The Homecoming (1964), No Man's Land (1975), Betrayal (1978), and Family Voices (1980).

== Ladbrokes favourites ==
On Ladbrokes, favourites to win the 2005 Nobel Prize in Literature were Turkish author Orhan Pamuk (awarded in 2006) and Syrian poet Adonis. Other strong contenders believed to be considered by the Swedish Academy included American novelists Joyce Carol Oates and Philip Roth, Canadian author Margaret Atwood, Czech author Milan Kundera, South Korean poet Ko Un, Peruvian-born novelist Mario Vargas Llosa (awarded in 2010) and Swedish poet Tomas Tranströmer (awarded in 2011).

== Reactions ==
When Horace Engdahl, permanent secretary of the Swedish Academy, announced Harold Pinter as the recipient of the 2005 Nobel prize, it instigated some public controversy and criticism relating both to characteristics of Pinter's work and to his politics. When interviewed that day about his reaction to the announcement, Pinter said: "I was told today that one of the Sky channels said this morning that 'Harold Pinter is dead.' Then they changed their mind and said, 'No, he's won the Nobel prize.' So I've risen from the dead."

== Nobel lecture ==
The Nobel Prize Awards Ceremony and related events throughout Scandinavia took place in December 2005. After the Academy notified Pinter of his award, he had planned to travel to Stockholm to deliver his Nobel lecture in person. In November, however, his doctor sent him to hospital and barred such travel, after a serious infection was diagnosed. Pinter's publisher, Stephen Page of Faber and Faber, accepted the Nobel Diploma and Nobel Medal at the Awards Ceremony in his place.

Although still being treated in hospital, Pinter videotaped his Nobel Lecture, "Art, Truth and Politics", at a Channel 4 studio. It was projected on three large screens at the Swedish Academy on the evening of 7 December 2005, and transmitted on More 4 that same evening in the UK. The 46-minute lecture was introduced on television by David Hare. Later, the text and streaming video formats (without Hare's introduction) were posted on the Nobel Prize and Swedish Academy official websites. It has since been released as a DVD.

Der Spiegel, described Pinter's speech as a "searing attack on US foreign policy". Michael Billington, writing in The Guardian, said Pinter's speech was "highly political, especially in its clinical dissection of post-war US foreign policy", which, Pinter said, had "supported and in many cases engendered every rightwing military dictatorship in the world after the end of the second world war". Billington wrote that a highlight of Pinter's speech was his critique of media coverage of US actions abroad: "Hundreds of thousands of deaths took place throughout these countries. Did they take place? And are they in all cases attributable to US foreign policy? The answer is yes they did take place and they are attributable to American foreign policy. But you wouldn't know it. It never happened. Nothing ever happened. Even while it was happening it wasn't happening. It didn't matter. It was of no interest. The crimes of the United States have been systematic, constant, vicious, remorseless, but very few people have actually talked about them. You have to hand it to America. It has exercised a quite clinical manipulation of power worldwide while masquerading as a force for universal good. It's a brilliant, even witty, highly successful act of hypnosis."

Pinter quoted Father John Metcalf speaking to Raymond Seitz, then Minister at the US Embassy in London, "My parishioners [in Nicaragua] built a school, a health centre, a cultural centre. We have lived in peace. A few months ago a Contra force attacked the parish. They destroyed everything: the school, the health centre, the cultural centre. They raped nurses and teachers, slaughtered doctors, in the most brutal manner. They behaved like savages. Please demand that the US government withdraw its support from this shocking terrorist activity." Seitz responded, "Let me tell you something. In war, innocent people always suffer." Pinter called the US invasion of Iraq "an arbitrary military action inspired by a series of lies upon lies and gross manipulation of the media and therefore of the public", and condemned the British government for its cooperation.

Pinter's lecture has been widely distributed by print and online media and has provoked much commentary and debate, with some commentators accusing Pinter of "anti-Americanism". In his Nobel Lecture, however, Pinter emphasises that he criticises policies and practices of American administrations (and those who voted for them), not all American citizens, many of whom he recognises as "demonstrably sickened, shamed and angered by their government's actions".
