= The arts and politics =

Relationship between art and politics

A strong relationship between the arts and politics, particularly between various kinds of art and power, occurs across historical epochs and cultures. As they respond to contemporaneous events and politics, the arts take on political as well as social dimensions, becoming themselves a focus of controversy and even a force of political as well as social change.

A widespread observation is that a great talent has a free spirit. For instance Pushkin, who some scholars regard as Russia's first great writer, is said to have attracted the irritation of the Russian officialdom and particularly of the Tsar, since he "instead of being a good servant of the state in the rank and file of the administration and extolling conventional virtues in his vocational writings (if write he must), composed extremely arrogant and extremely independent and extremely wicked verse in which a dangerous freedom of thought was evident in the novelty of his versification, in the audacity of his sensual fancy, and in his propensity for making fun of major and minor tyrants."

== History of art ==
According to Groys, "Art has its own power in the world, and is as much a force in the power play of global politics today as it once was in the arena of cold war politics."

=== Social and political change ===
Pertaining to such politically-intractable phenomena as the Modern conflicts in the Middle East, however, some artists and social critics believe that "art is useless as a tool for political change." There are, nevertheless, examples where artists employ art in the service of political change.

== Role of poetry ==
Poets are the unacknowledged legislators of the world.

— Percy Bysshe Shelley, A Defence of Poetry

The Italian poet Ungaretti, when interviewed on transgression by director Pasolini for the 1964 Love Meetings documentary, said that the foundation of poetry is to transgress all laws.

The recitation of powerful, pithy poetry is a popular art form at American protests and political rallies. From the civil rights, women's liberation, gay rights, and Puerto Rican Independence movements to Black Lives Matter, poetry is used to build emotional unity in crowds and draw media attention. Giannina Braschi wrote, "Poets and anarchists are always the first to go. Where? To the frontline. Wherever it is." Protest poems include Gwendolyn Brooks "Riot", Allen Ginsberg's "Howl", Tato Laviera's "Lady Liberty", Nikki Giovanni's "Rosa Parks", Amiri Baraka's "Short Speech to My Friends," and Jill McDonough's "Dear Gaybashers". Beat poet Allen Ginsberg was arrested at an antiwar demonstration in New York City in 1967 and tear-gassed at the Democratic National Convention in Chicago in 1968.

== Examples ==
=== Situationist International ===
The Situationist International (SI), a small group of international political and artistic agitators with roots in Marxism, Lettrism and the early 20th-century European artistic and political avant-gardes formed in 1957, aspired to major social and political transformations; before disbanding in 1972 and splitting into a number of different groups, including the Situationist Bauhaus, the Antinational, and the Second Situationist International, the first SI became active in Europe through the 1960s and elsewhere throughout the world and was characterized by an anti-capitalist and surrealist perspective on aesthetics and politics, according to Italian art historian Francesco Poli.

In the works of the situationists, Italian scholar Mirella Bandini observes, there is no separation between art and politics; the two confront each other in revolutionary terms.

McDonough believes that once artistic-intellectual works are separated from current events and from a comprehensive critique of society, they are sterilized and can be safely integrated into the official culture and the public discourse, where they can add new flavours to old dominant ideas and play the role of a gear wheel in the mechanism of the society of the spectacle.

=== Poster art ===
"Not content with claiming leftwing music", posters for the Conservative Party in the UK recycled iconic art styles of "socialist revolution" to communicate its political message in 2008.

In the 2008 U.S. presidential election, Shepard Fairey's Barack Obama "Hope" poster became almost instantly iconic and inseparable from Obama and his campaign. Almost immediately after its creation, the artwork went viral, spreading throughout social media and through word of mouth (largely due to the publicity efforts of Yosi Sergant).

Throughout history, Communist governments have used poster art as a common form of propaganda used to promote the ideology of communism, namely the Soviet Union in the early 20th Century. The Great Soviet Encyclopedia defines communist propaganda as being the expression of the essential worldview of the working class and its natural aims and interests defined by its historical position as the social force which will ultimately usher in the epoch of communism.

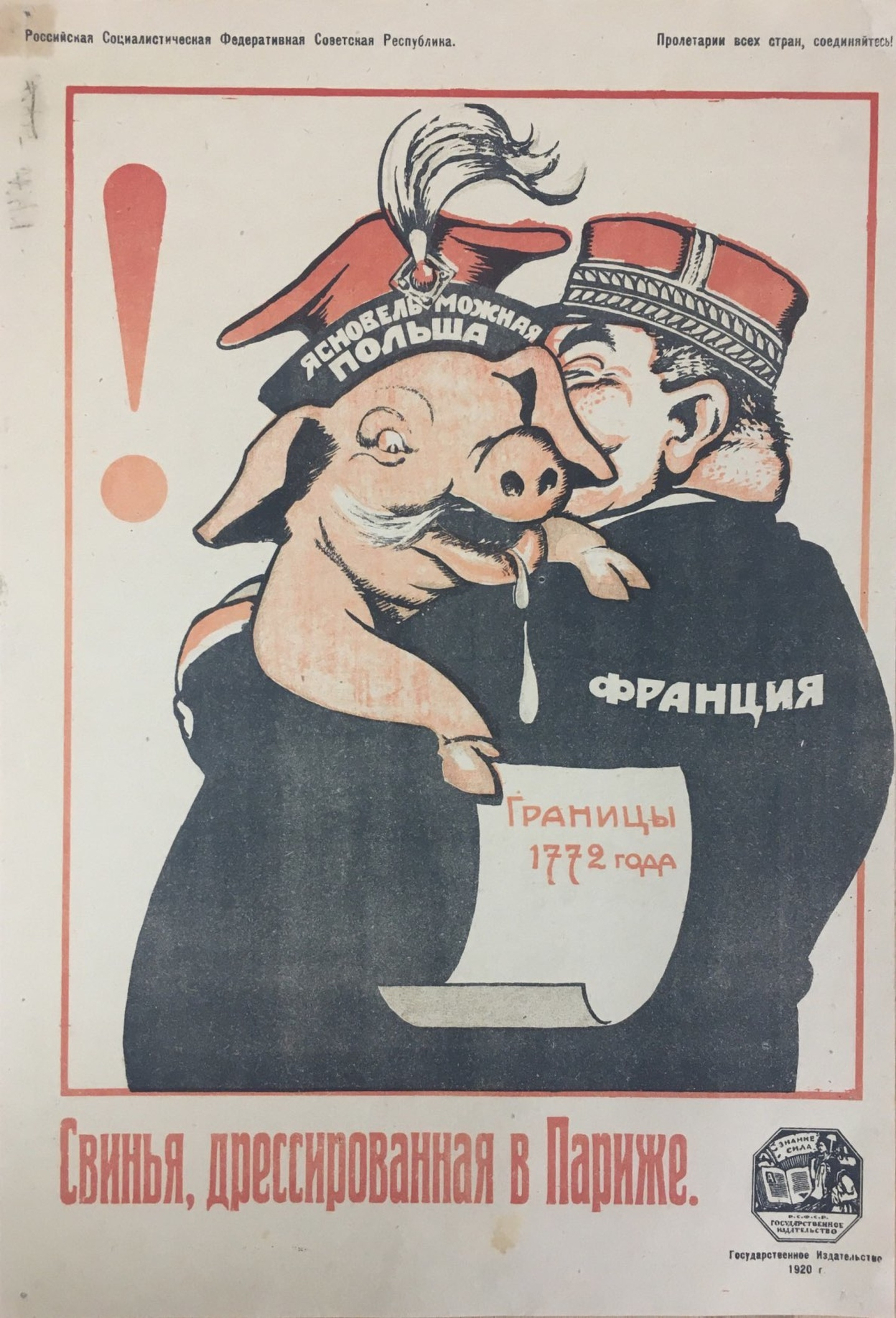
"Pig trained in Paris" Soviet poster

=== Entropa ===
Czech sculptor David Černý's Entropa, a sculpture commissioned to mark the Czech presidency of the European Union Council during the first semester of 2009, illustrates how art can come into conflict with politics, creating various kinds of controversy in the process, both intentionally and unintentionally. Entropa attracted controversy both for its stereotyped depictions of the various EU member states and for having been a creation of Černý and two friends rather than, as Černý purported, a collaboration of 27 artists from each of the member states. Some European Union members states reacted negatively to the depiction of their country, with Bulgaria, for instance, deciding to summon the Czech Ambassador to Sofia in order to discuss the illustration of the Balkan country as a collection of squat toilets (ČTK). This "Europe-wide hoax … reveals deeper truths" not only about the countries but "about art itself" (Gavrilova).

=== Russian aesthetics ===
After the Russian Revolution, Soviet Art came under strict ideological control. According to Esti Sheinberg, a lecturer in music at the University of Edinburgh, in her book about Russian composer Dmitri Shostakovich, Irony, Satire, Parody and the Grotesque in the Music of Shostakovich, in "the traditional Russian perception of the arts", an "interrelationship between artistic technique and ideological content is the main aesthetic criterion" (ix; cf. Blois).

=== Classical music ===
Ludwig van Beethoven did not use the original title "Ode to Freedom" of Friedrich Schiller's lyric, known in English as "Ode to Joy" (1785), in setting it to music in the final movement of his Ninth Symphony (1824), which "Napoleonic censors had forced the poet to change to 'Ode to Joy'." After the fall of the Berlin Wall, on 9 November 1989, that Christmas Day, when Leonard Bernstein conducted a performance of Beethoven's Ninth at the site of the former East German–West German border in Berlin, a concert telecast nationally in the United States, he substituted Freedom for Joy to reflect his own "personal message".

=== Folk and protest music ===
In February 1952, the United States Customs Service seized the passport of Paul Robeson, preventing him from leaving the United States to travel to the Fourth Canadian Convention of the International Union of Mine, Mill, and Smelter Workers, in Vancouver, British Columbia, Canada; but, after "The convention heard Robeson sing over the telephone", the union organized "a concert on the US-Canada border". According to the account of the "Paul Robeson Centennial Celebration": "Robeson sang and spoke for 45 minutes. He introduced his first song stating 'I stand here today under great stress because I dare, as do you—all of you, to fight for peace and for a decent life for all men, women and children' … [and, accompanied by Lawrence Brown on piano,] proceeded to sing spirituals, folk songs, labour songs, and a passionate version of Old Man River, written for him in the [1920s], slowly enunciating 'show a little grit and you land in jail', underlining the fact that his government had turned the entire country into a prison for Robeson and many others."

In the 1960s the songs of Pete Seeger, Joan Baez, Bob Dylan, and others protested further racism, war, and the military-industrial complex, continuing an American artistic tradition of political protest founded during its colonial era.

=== Restrictions on live-music venues ===
==== In the United States ====
In force from July 1985 until May 2002 and considered by its opponents a Draconian "anti-music law", the Teen Dance Ordinance (TDO), imposing restrictions on clubs admitting those under the legal drinking age of 21 in Seattle, Washington, was still the subject of protracted political and legal opposition in U.S. Federal Court in early 2002, when a suit filed by the Joint Artists and Music Promotions Action Committee (JAMPAC) in 2000 was still being adjudicated. In May 2002, Judge Lasnik ruled for the City of Seattle on JAMPAC's suit, finding no Constitutional infringement of the First Amendment and deciding that the matter is a political one for the Seattle City Council to decide, not the courts; during the course of the suit, Mayor Schell's successor, Greg Nickels, a proponent of the bill, resubmitted the ordinance to the Seattle City Council, and, on 12 August 2002, the new All-Ages Dance Ordinance (AADO) replaced the TDO, but was not considered much of an improvement by its critics.

In May 2008 a "Promoters Ordinance" proposed by the Chicago City Council aroused opposition in Chicago, Illinois, for being regarded as overly restrictive and stifling free expression.

==== In the United Kingdom ====
Following the implementation of the Licensing Act 2003, the London Borough of Hillingdon cited "the interest of public order and the prevention of terrorism" as reasons for expecting promoters of live music events to complete the Metropolitan Police's Form 696. Though later clarified by a police spokesperson as not "compulsory", the perceived "demand" for the information solicited on such "risk assessment" forms motivated Jon McClure, lead singer with Reverend and The Makers, to post an electronic petition in the "E-Petitions" section of the official website of Gordon Brown, the UK Prime Minister, at Number10.gov.uk, in order to facilitate protest against what McClure alleges is "racial discrimination" occasioned by such bureaucratic constraints, which some have deemed "police authoritarianism". It begins: "We the undersigned petition the Prime Minister to Scrap the unnecessary and draconian usage of the 696 Form from London music events". By 11 November 2008, according to Orlowski, "A dozen London boroughs [had] implemented a 'risk assessment' [Form 696] policy for live music that permits the police to ban any live music if they fail to receive personal details from the performers 14 days in advance." Orlowski points out:

The demand explicitly singles out performances and musical styles favoured by the black community: garage and R&B, and MCs and DJs. ... However all musical performances – from one man playing a guitar on up – are subject to the demands once implemented by the council. And the threat is serious: failure to comply 'may jeopardise future events by the promoter or the venue'. ... UK Music chief Feargal Sharkey ... speaking to the Department of Culture Media and Sport's hearing on venue licensing today [11 Nov. 2008] [concluded that] ... 'Live music is now a threat to the prevention of terrorism'. ... In response, Detective Superintendent Dave Eyles from the Met's clubs and vice office told us that 10,000 such Risk Assessments would be processed this year. He said they weren't compulsory: ... 'We can't demand it – we recommend that you provide it as best practice. But you're bloody silly if you don't, because you're putting your venue at risk.'

By early March 2009, over 16,000 British citizens or residents had signed McClure's E-Petition, which remained open to potential signatories until 1 December 2009.

== See also ==
- Anti-art
- Art, Truth and Politics, by Harold Pinter
- Artivism
- Minjung art
- Music and politics
- Poet as legislator
- Political cinema
- Political satire
- Political drama
- Yale student abortion art controversy
- @earth
- Tamil cinema and Dravidian politics
