= Art, Truth and Politics =

2006 lecture by Harold Pinter

- Produced by: Linda Zuck; Executive Producers: John Wyver and Michael Kustow
- Starring: Harold Pinter
- Distributed by: Illuminations
- Release date: March 2006
- Running time: 46 minutes

Art, Truth and Politics is the Nobel Lecture delivered on video by 2005 Nobel Laureate in Literature Harold Pinter (1930–2008), who was hospitalized at the time and unable to deliver it in Stockholm in person. The lecture was critical of United States global policy, and attracted much debate over his stance against the Iraq War.

The 46-minute videotaped lecture was projected on three large screens in front of the audience at the Swedish Academy, in Stockholm, on the evening of 7 December 2005. It was simultaneously transmitted on British television channel More 4, with an introduction by Pinter's friend and fellow playwright David Hare. Soon after its videotaped delivery and simulcast, the full text and streaming video formats were available on the Nobel Prize and Swedish Academy websites.

A privately printed limited edition, Art, Truth and Politics: The Nobel Lecture, was published by Faber and Faber on 16 March 2006. It was also published in The Essential Pinter, by Grove Press on 10 October 2006 (Pinter's 76th birthday); in the "Appendix" of Harold Pinter, the revised and enlarged edition of Pinter's official authorized biography by Michael Billington (Faber, 2007); and in the 3rd edition of Harold Pinter's collection Various Voices, published posthumously (Faber, 2009). Many print and online periodicals have also published the full text of Pinter's Nobel Lecture, including Publications of the Modern Language Association (PMLA) in May 2006, with permission from the Nobel Foundation.

DVD and VHS video recordings of Pinter's Nobel Lecture (without Hare's introduction) are also produced and distributed by Illuminations. These recordings have introductions by writer Salman Rushdie, who is Pinter's close friend and chairman of PEN World Voices. As part of the fifth PEN World Voices Festival, they were shown publicly in the United States for the first time at the Harold Pinter Memorial Celebration, which took place on the Martin E. Segal Theatre Center of CUNY Graduate Center on 2 May 2009.

== Art, Truth and Politics: The Nobel Lecture ==
Speaking with obvious difficulty in the lecture while seated in a wheelchair, Pinter distinguishes between the search for truth in art and the avoidance of truth in politics (5–10).

He describes his own artistic process of creating The Homecoming and Old Times, following an initial line or word or image, calling "the author's position" an "odd one" as, experiencing the "strange moment … of creating characters who up to that moment have had no existence," he must "play a never-ending game with them, cat and mouse, blind man's buff, hide and seek" during which "the search for the truth … has to be faced, right there, on the spot." Distinguishing among his plays The Birthday Party, Mountain Language, and Ashes to Ashes, he segues into his transitions from "the search for truth" in art and "the entirely different set of problems" facing the artist in "Political theatre" to the avoidance of seeking "truth" in "power politics" (5–9).

He asserts:

Political language, as used by politicians, does not venture into any of this territory [of the artist] since the majority of politicians, on the evidence available to us, are interested not in truth but in power and in the maintenance of that power. To maintain that power it is essential that people remain in ignorance, that they live in ignorance of the truth, even the truth of their own lives. What surrounds us therefore is a vast tapestry of lies, upon which we feed.

As every single person here knows, the justification for the invasion of Iraq was that Saddam Hussein possessed a highly dangerous body of weapons of mass destruction, some of which could be fired in 45 minutes, bringing about appalling devastation. We were assured that was true. It was not true. We were told that Iraq had a relationship with Al-Qaeda and shared responsibility for the atrocity in New York of September 11, 2001. We were assured that this was true. It was not true. We were told that Iraq threatened the security of the world. We were assured it was true. It was not true.

The truth is something entirely different. The truth is to do with how the United States understands its role in the world and how it chooses to embody it.

Charging the United States with having "supported and in many cases engendered every right wing military dictatorship in the world after the end of the Second World War", leading to "hundreds of thousands of deaths," Pinter asks: "Did they take place? And are they in all cases attributable to US foreign policy?" Then he answers his own question: "The answer is yes, they did take place, and they are attributable to American foreign policy. But you wouldn't know it" (9–10).

Revisiting arguments from his political essays and speeches of the past decade, Pinter reiterates:

It never happened. Nothing ever happened. Even while it was happening, it wasn't happening. It didn't matter. It was of no interest. The crimes of the United States have been systematic, constant, vicious, remorseless, but very few people have actually talked about them. You have to hand it to America. It has exercised a quite clinical manipulation of power worldwide while masquerading as a force for universal good. It's a brilliant, even witty, highly successful act of hypnosis.

I put to you that the United States is without doubt the greatest show on the road. Brutal, indifferent, scornful and ruthless it may be but it is also very clever. As a salesman, it is out on its own and its most saleable commodity is self-love. It's a winner. Listen to all American presidents on television say the words, 'the American people', as in the sentence, 'I say to the American people it is time to pray and to defend the rights of the American people and I ask the American people to trust their president in the action he is about to take on behalf of the American people.' (15)

In imagery recalling his description of "speech" as "a constant stratagem to cover nakedness", Pinter adds:

It's a scintillating stratagem. Language is actually employed to keep thought at bay. The words 'the American people' provide a truly voluptuous cushion of reassurance. You don't need to think. Just lie back on the cushion. The cushion may be suffocating your intelligence and your critical faculties but it's very comfortable. This does not apply of course to the 40 million people living below the poverty line and the 2 million men and women imprisoned in the vast gulag of prisons, which extends across the US. (16)

Toward the end of the lecture, after reading two poems referring to "blood in the streets", "deaths", "dead bodies", and "death" by fellow Nobel Laureate Pablo Neruda ("I'm Explaining a Few Things") and himself ("Death"), in a whimsically humble gesture, Pinter offers to "volunteer" for the "job" of "speech writer" for President George W. Bush, penning a message of fierce aggression masquerading as moral struggle of good versus evil yet finally proffering the "authority" of his (Bush's) "fist" (17–22). Pinter demands prosecution of Tony Blair in the International Criminal Court, while ironically pointing out he would do the same for Bush had he not refused to "ratify" that Court (18).

Pinter concludes his Nobel Lecture with a call for "unflinching, unswerving, fierce intellectual determination, as citizens, to define the real truth of our lives and our societies" as "a crucial obligation which devolves upon us all," one which he regards as "in fact mandatory," for, he warns, "If such a determination is not embodied in our political vision we have no hope of restoring what is so nearly lost to us – the dignity of man" (23–24).

== Critical response ==
Pinter's Nobel Lecture has been the source of much debate. In an article published in The Chronicle of Higher Education on 11 November 2005, entitled "Pinter's Plays, Pinter's Politics," Middlebury College English professor Jay Parini observed that "In the weeks that have passed since Harold Pinter won the Nobel Prize in Literature, there has been incessant chatter on both sides of the Atlantic, some of it unflattering," as "from the right, in particular, the American reaction to the Pinter award has been one of outrage," whereas "the reaction to the award from Pinter's peers––Michael Frayn, David Hare, Tom Stoppard, and others––has been uniformly positive". Parini concluded that "It may be true this time around that the Nobel Prize in Literature was given to the right man for the right reasons" due to Pinter's influence and attitude against oppression.

Heated critical debate about Pinter spiked in the public media and throughout the blogosphere. Such criticism of Pinter encompassed thousands of commentaries and focused mostly on his political activism, particularly around his purported "anti-Americanism" and generally "leftist" views.

Pinter's authorised and official biographer, Michael Billington said reactions were "fascinating" and "overwhelmingly positive," though he thought that "it is worth picking out the few negative ones" as examples. He claimed "the most startling fact was that Pinter's Nobel Lecture on 7 December was totally ignored by the BBC", adding: "You would have thought that a living British dramatist's views on his art and global politics might have been of passing interest to a public service broadcaster"; yet "There was ... no reference to the speech on any of BBC TV's news bulletins that night or indeed on its current affairs programme, Newsnight".

The biography also gave rebuttals to arguments from the press, such as Scottish journalist Johann Hari characterizing the speech as a rant and "claimed that Pinter would have refused to resist Hitler". Billington wrote that Pinter "has repeatedly said that, had he been of age, he would have accepted conscription in World War II". He also stated that "More predictably, Christopher Hitchens was wheeled out to dismiss Pinter as 'a bigmouth who has strutted and fretted his hour upon the stage for far too long' ", and, finally, Billington cites Scottish historian Niall Ferguson's "attack" on the Lecture in The Daily Telegraph, quoting in part Ferguson's statement that in his Nobel Lecture Pinter " 'pretend[s] that [US] crimes were equivalent to those of its Communist opponents ...' " which was charactarised as an distorion by both Billington and Pinter.

== Being Harold Pinter ==
Pinter's Nobel Lecture is excerpted in a dramatic work developed and performed by the politically dissident Belarus Free Theatre, which has been censored, its members arrested and prevented from performing their work publicly in their own country. Being Harold Pinter is "a collation of six Pinter plays, excerpts from his Nobel Prize speech, and letters written by political prisoners in Belarusian jails," which was performed with Pinter in the audiences in Leeds, England, during the Artist and Citizen: 50 Years of Performing Pinter, an international conference celebrating Pinter on the occasion of the awarding of an honorary degree to him by the University of Leeds, in April 2007; and in London, premiering there from 11 to 23 February 2008.

The piece received appreciative press reviews in both Leeds and London, including 5 stars from Pinter's official biographer Michael Billington, in his Guardian review, and 4 stars from the Times reviewer Sam Marlowe, who observes that "Drama doesn't come more urgently political than in the work of the Belarus Free Theatre." Also to critical acclaim, it premiered in New South Wales, Australia, beginning on 8 January 2009, two weeks after Pinter's death, and there are plans to bring the troupe over to perform Being Harold Pinter in New York City, as part of the Public Theater's Under the Radar Festival, according to its director Mark Russell.

== See also ==
- The arts and politics

== Works cited ==
=== Primary sources ===
- Pinter, Harold. Art, Truth and Politics: The Nobel Lecture. Presented on video in Stockholm, Sweden. 7 December 2005. Nobel Foundation and Swedish Academy. Published as "The Nobel Lecture: Art, Truth & Politics". NobelPrize.org. Nobel Foundation, 8 December 2005. Web. 2 October 2007. (RealPlayer streaming audio and video as well as text available). London: Faber and Faber, 2006. ISBN 0-571-23396-1 (10). ISBN 978-0-571-23396-0 (13). Rpt. also in The Essential Pinter. New York: Grove, 2006. (Listed below.) Rpt. also in PMLA: Publications of the Modern Language Association 121 (2006): 811–18. Print. Rpt. also in The Pinter Review: Nobel Prize/Europe Theatre Prize Volume: 2005 – 2008. Ed. Francis Gillen with Steven H. Gale. Tampa: U of Tampa P, 2008. 5–17. ISBN 978-1-879852-19-8 (hardcover). ISBN 978-1-879852-20-4 (softcover). ISSN 0895-9706. Print.
- –––. "Art, Truth and Politics: The Nobel Lecture". Guardian. Guardian Media Group, 2 October 2007 and 8 December 2005 World Wide Web. 2 October 2007 and 7 May 2009. ["In his video-taped Nobel acceptance speech, Harold Pinter excoriated a 'brutal, scornful and ruthless' United States. This is the full text of his address"; features links relating to Harold Pinter's 2005 Nobel Prize in Literature. (Originally part of "Special Report: The Nobel Prize for Literature: 2005 Harold Pinter". Periodically updated and re-located since 2005.)]
- –––. The Essential Pinter: Selections from the Work of Harold Pinter. New York: Grove, 2006. ISBN 0-8021-4269-9 (10). ISBN 978-0-8021-4269-6 (13). Print. [Inc. "Art, Truth & Politics: The 2005 Nobel Lecture"; 8 plays and the dramatic sketch "Press Conference"; and 10 poems.]
- –––. Various Voices: Sixty Years of Prose, Poetry, Politics 1948–2008. 3rd ed. 1998, 2005. London: Faber, 2009. ISBN 978-0-571-24480-5. Print.
- Swedish Academy. "The Nobel Prize in Literature 2005: Harold Pinter". Nobelprize.org. Swedish Academy and Nobel Foundation, 13 October 2005. Web. 4 October 2007. [Hyperlinked account. Provides links to the official Nobel Prize announcement, Bio-bibliography, Bibliography, press release, press conference, and audio and video streaming media files of the press conference and related interviews and features. These resources are accessible on the official websites of both the Nobel Prize (Nobel Foundation) and the Swedish Academy; they are periodically revised and re-located.]
- Wästberg, Per. "The Nobel Prize in Literature 2005: Presentation Speech". Nobelprize.org. The Nobel Foundation and The Swedish Academy, 10 December 2005. Web, 2 October 2007. [Full text; links to video clips of the Nobel Ceremony provided online.]

=== Secondary sources ===
- Allen-Mills, Tony. "This Pinter Guy Could Turn Into a Pain". Times Online. News International, 6 November 2005. Web. 15 March 2009. ["Belatedly, Americans are wising up to a Nobel menace, says Tony Allen-Mills."]
- Anderson, Porter. "Harold Pinter: Theater's Angry Old Man: At the Prize of Europe, the Playwright Is All Politics." CNN.com. CNN, 17 March 2006. Web. 2 October 2007.
- Billington, Michael. "Being Harold Pinter/Generation Jeans: 5 Stars Soho, London". Guardian.co.uk, Culture: Stage: Theatre. Guardian Media Group, 18 February 2008. Web, 8 May 2009.
- –––. Harold Pinter. London: Faber, 2007. ISBN 978-0-571-23476-9 (13). Updated 2nd ed. of The Life and Work of Harold Pinter. 1996. London: Faber, 1997. ISBN 0-571-17103-6 (10). Print.
- –––. "The Importance of Being Pinter: A New Production by the Belarus Free Theatre Reinforces the Global Resonance of the British Playwright's Political Works." Guardian, Arts blog – Theatre. Guardian Media Group, 16 April 2007. Web. 8 May 2009.
- –––. "Passionate Pinter's Devastating Assault On US Foreign Policy: Shades of Beckett As Ailing Playwright Delivers Powerful Nobel Lecture." Guardian. Guardian Media Group, 8 December 2005, Books. Web. 2 October 2007.
- Bond, Paul. "Harold Pinter's Artistic Achievement". World Socialist Web Site. World Socialist Web Site, 29 December 2005. Web. 2 October 2007.
- "Bush and Blair Slated by Pinter". BBC News. BBC, 7 December 2005. Web. 2 October 2007. (Features related links.)
- Chrisafis, Angelique, and Imogen Tilden. "Pinter Blasts 'Nazi America' and 'deluded idiot' Blair". Guardian. Guardian Media Group, 11 June 2003. Web. 2 October 2007.
- Eden, Richard, and Tim Walker. "Mandrake: A Pinteresque Silence". Sunday Telegraph. Telegraph Media Group, 27 August 2006. Web. 2 October 2007. <https://www.telegraph.co.uk/opinion/main.jhtml?xml=/opinion/2006/08/27/nosplit/dp2701.xml> (original URL). Bookrags: HighBeam Research. Cengage Learning (Gale), 27 August 2006. Web. 16 March 2009. [Free trial for non-subscribers.]
- Ferguson, Niall. "Personal View: Do the Sums, Then Compare US and Communist Crimes from the Cold War". Daily Telegraph. Telegraph Media Group, 11 December 2005. Web. 9 May 2009.
- Freed, Donald. "The Courage of Harold Pinter". Presentation at Artist and Citizen: 50 Years of Performing Pinter. University of Leeds, 13 April 2007. Another America. Donald Freed, Apr. 2007. Web. 28 May 2007.
- Hari, Johann. "Johann Hari: Pinter Does Not Deserve the Nobel Prize: The Only Response to His Nobel Rant (and Does Anyone Doubt It Will Be a Rant?) Will Be a Long, Long Pause" (column). Independent, Comment. Independent News & Media, 6 December 2005. Johann Hari, 2 October 2007. Web. 12 October 2007. [Archived in johannhari.com.]
- "Harold Pinter Meets Free Theatre in Leeds". Press release. Belarus Free Theatre. Belarus Free Theatre, 2 May 2007. Web. 2 October 2007. [English version has some typographical errors; also accessible in Belarusian [p??????] and in French [français]. Features photographs reposted from Mark Taylor-Batty's University of Leeds Website for the conference Artist and Citizen: 50 Years of Performing Pinter.]
- Hickling, Alfred. "Being Harold Pinter ***** Workshop, University of Leeds". Guardian. Guardian Media Group, 16 April 2007. Web. 2 October 2007.
- Hitchens, Christopher. "Opinion: The Sinister Mediocrity of Harold Pinter". Wall Street Jour. 17 October 2005, A18. Print. Wall Street Journal (Dow Jones & Company), 17 October 2005. Web. 7 May 2009. [Electronic ed.; printable version "for personal, non-commercial use only."]
- Howard, Jennifer. "Nobel Prize in Literature Goes to Harold Pinter, British Playwright Widely Studied in Academe". Chronicle of Higher Education. Chronicle of Higher Education, 13 October 2006. Web. 2 October 2007.
- Hudgins, Christopher C. "The Nobel Prize Festivities: Stockholm, December 2005. A Joyous Report." The Pinter Review: Nobel Prize/Europe Theatre Prize Volume: 2005 – 2008. Ed. Francis Gillen with Steven H. Gale. Tampa: U of Tampa P, 2008. 43–50. Print.
- Lyall, Sarah (8 December 2005). "Playwright Takes a Prize and a Jab at U.S." The New York Times. The New York Times Company. [Correction appended 10 December 2005: "An article on Thursday about the playwright Harold Pinter's criticism of American foreign policy in his acceptance speech for the Nobel Prize for literature described it incompletely. He said that both President Bush and Prime Minister Tony Blair – and not just Prime Minister Blair – should be tried before the International Criminal Court of Justice for the invasion of Iraq."]
- [McDowell, Leslie.] "Book Festival Reviews: Pinter at 75: The Anger Still Burns: Harold Pinter". The Scotsman 26 August 2006: 5. Print. The Scotsman Publications Limited (Johnston Press Plc), (updated) 27 August 2006. Web. 6 January 2009.
- Merritt, Susan Hollis. "(Anti-)Global Pinter." The Pinter Review: Nobel Prize/Europe Theatre Prize Volume: 2005 – 2008. Ed. Francis Gillen with Steven H. Gale. Tampa: U of Tampa P, 2008. 140–67. Print.
- –––. "Nobel Week 2005–The Experience of a Lifetime: Homage to Harold Pinter." The Pinter Review: Nobel Prize/Europe Theatre Prize Volume: 2005 – 2008. Ed. Francis Gillen with Steven H. Gale. Tampa: U of Tampa P, 2008. 51–65. Print.
- –––, comp. "Harold Pinter Bibliography: 2002–2004 With a Special Supplement on the 2005 Nobel Prize in Literature, October 2005 – May 2006." The Pinter Review: Nobel Prize/Europe Theatre Prize Volume: 2005 – 2008. Ed. Francis Gillen with Steven H. Gale. Tampa: U of Tampa P, 2008. 261–343. Print.
- "The Nobel Prize for Literature 2005: Harold Pinter". Guardian. Guardian Media Group, [2005–2009]. Web. 23 March 2009. [Index of articles; some part of "Special Reports: The Nobel Prize for Literature" in 2005.]
- Parini, Jay. "Theater: Pinter's Plays, Pinter's Politics". Chronicle of Higher Education, Chronicle Rev. Chronicle of Higher Education, 11 November 2005. World Wide Web. 2 October 2007. (3 pages.)
- Pryce-Jones, David. "Harold Pinter's Special Triteness: Harold Pinter Wins the Nobel Prize in Literature." National Review 7 November 2005. National Review Online (National Review, Inc.), 28 October 2005. Web. 3 March 2009. Rpt. in "News Publications: 2005 Ad". BNET: Business Network. FindArticles (Gale Cengage Learning), 2008. CBS Interactive, Inc., 2009. Web. 7 March 2009. (3 pages.)
- Riddell, Mary. "Comment: Prophet without Honour: Harold Pinter Can Be Cantankerous and Puerile. But He Is a Worthy Nobel Prizewinner." Guardian.co.uk. Guardian Media Group, 11 December 2005. Web. 6 January 2009.
- Smith, Neil. " 'Political element' to Pinter Prize?" BBC News. BBC, 13 October 2005. Web. 2 October 2007.
- Traub, James. "The Way We Live Now: Their Highbrow Hatred of Us". New York Times Mag.. New York Times Company, 30 October 2005. Web. 30 October 2005.
