= Norwegian Cuba Association =

The Norwegian Cuba Association (Norwegian: Cubaforeningen i Norge, Spanish: Asociación de amistad Noruego-Cubana) is a Norwegian advocacy group.

Established on 17 April 1964 as Norsk-Cubansk Forening, its purpose is to "further the friendship between Norway and Cuba" and to spread information about the "real Cuba". It publishes the magazine Cuba Nytt, and arranges for groups known as "brigades" to travel to Cuba.

It condemns the United States embargo against Cuba, demands the extradition of Luis Posada Carriles and the release of the Cuban 5, and supports a campaign to award the Nobel Peace Prize to Fidel Castro. Harboring several viewpoints that do not directly pertain to Cuba, the organization supports the Bolivarian Revolution in Venezuela, opposes the Colombian Uribe government as well as the Iraq War, and calls for a boycott of Israel through membership in the network Boikott Israel.
