= List of historical cuisines =

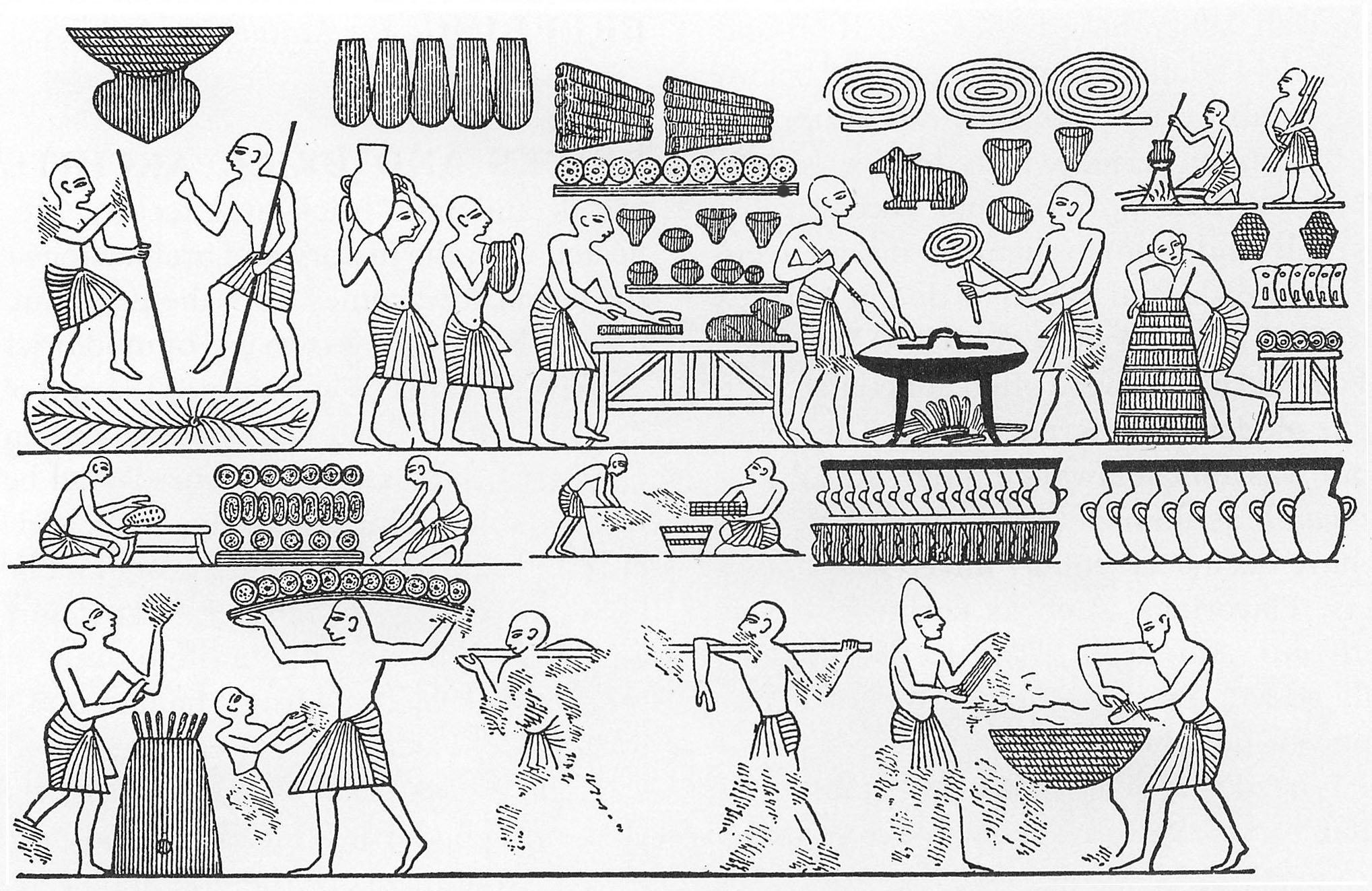
Ancient Egyptian cuisine: the royal bakery. Tomb of Ramesses III, Valley of the Kings

This list of historical cuisines lists cuisines from recent and ancient history by continent. Current cuisine is the subject of other articles.

== Africa ==
- Ancient Egyptian cuisine

== Americas ==
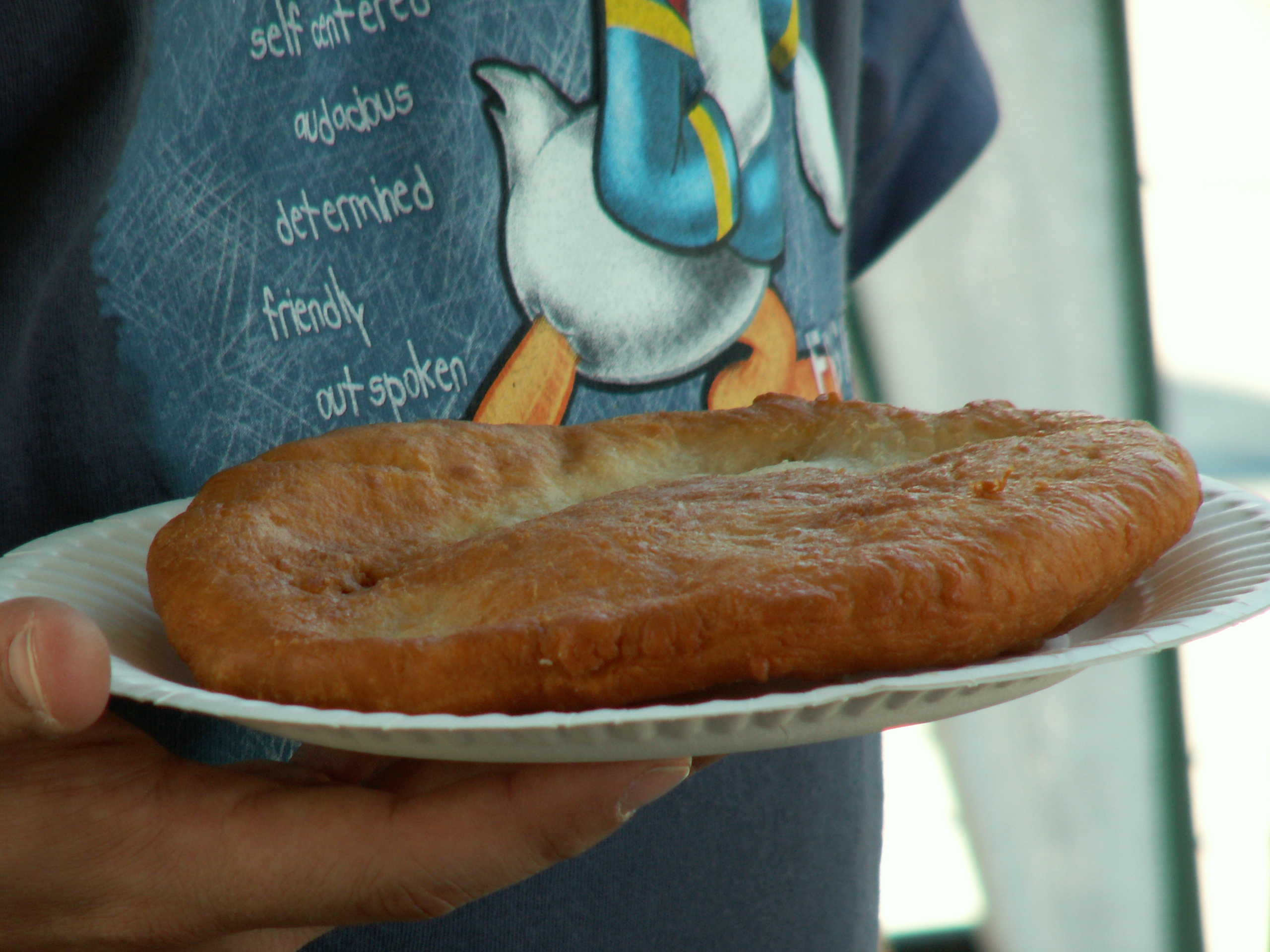
Frybread, a staple of Native American cuisine

- Native American cuisine
- Pre-Columbian cuisine
  - Aztec cuisine
  - Maya cuisine
  - Inca cuisine
  - Muisca cuisine
- Cuisine of the Thirteen Colonies
- Cuisine of Antebellum America

== Asia ==
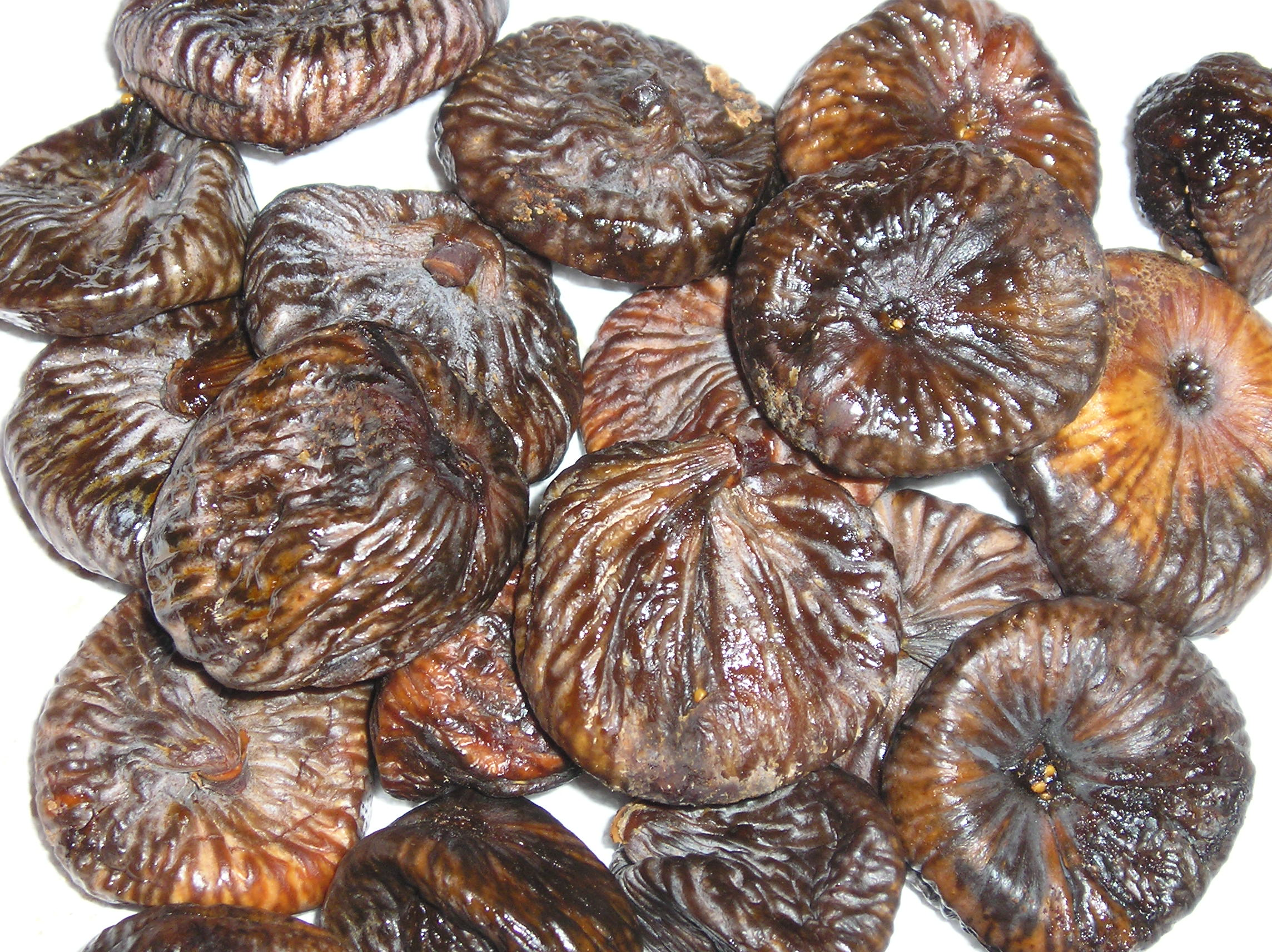
Dried figs, a winter food in Ancient Israelite cuisine

- Ancient Israelite cuisine
- Byzantine cuisine
- Hittite cuisine
- History of Chinese cuisine
- History of Japanese cuisine
- History of Korean cuisine
  - Korean royal court cuisine
- Indian subcontinent
  - History of Indian cuisine
  - Mughlai cuisine
  - Origins of North Indian and Pakistani foods
- Iranian cuisine
- Sumerian cuisine
- Ottoman cuisine

== Europe ==
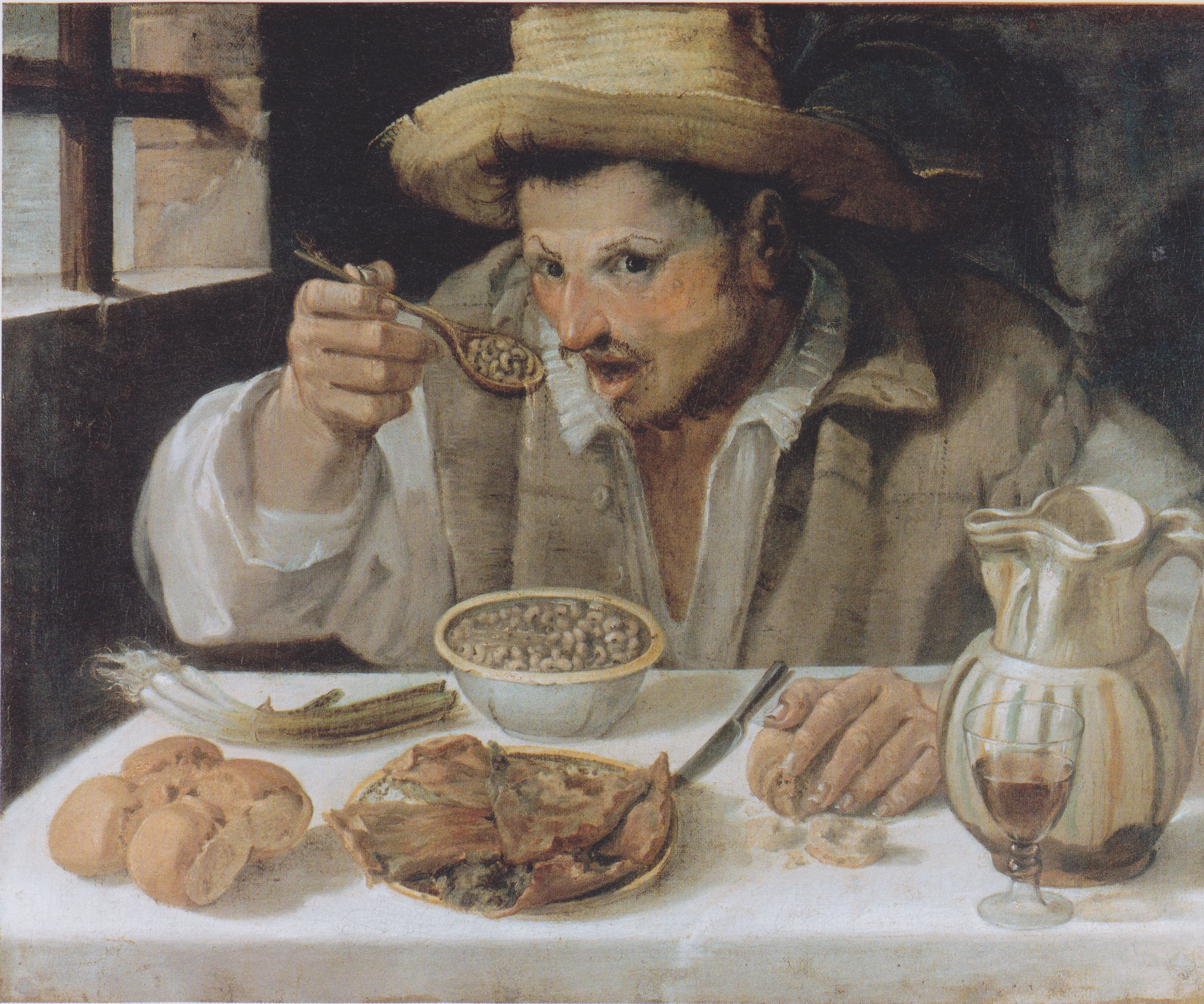
Beans, a staple in Early modern European cuisine

- Ancient Greek cuisine
- Ancient Roman cuisine
- Medieval cuisine
- Early modern European cuisine
- Tudor food and drink
- Victorian cuisine
- Soviet cuisine

== Oceania ==
- Native cuisine of Hawaii

== See also ==
- Food history
- List of ancient dishes
- List of post-classical dishes
- Paleolithic diet
- Timeline of food
