= Outline of cuisines =

Characteristic style of cooking practices and traditions

The following outline is provided as an overview of and topical guide to cuisines:

Cuisine – specific set of cooking traditions and practices, often associated with a specific culture. It is frequently named after the region or place where its underlining culture is present. A cuisine is primarily influenced by the ingredients that are available locally or through trade.

== What is a cuisine? ==
- Style of food preparation – preparing food for eating, generally requires selection, measurement and combination of ingredients in an ordered procedure so as to achieve desired results. Food preparation includes but is not limited to cooking.
- Food and drink – see 'Components of a cuisine', below

== Types of cuisine ==
See: List of cuisines

== Components of a cuisine ==
=== Food and drink ===
- Drink (beverages) of particular types – drinks are liquids specifically prepared for human consumption. In addition to basic needs, beverages form part of the culture of human society. Although all beverages, including juice, soft drinks, and carbonated drinks, have some form of water in them, water itself is often not classified as a beverage, and the word beverage has been recurrently defined as not referring to water. See List of beverages.
- Food of particular types, including the way it is presented – food is any substance consumed to provide nutritional support for the body. It is usually of plant or animal origin, and contains essential nutrients, such as fats, proteins, vitamins, or minerals. The substance is ingested by an organism and assimilated by the organism's cells to provide energy, maintain life, or stimulate growth. See List of foods, Lists of prepared foods.
  - Food presentation – art of modifying, processing, arranging, or decorating food to enhance its aesthetic appeal. The visual presentation of foods is often considered by chefs at many different stages of food preparation, from the manner of tying or sewing meats, to the type of cut used in chopping and slicing meats or vegetables, to the style of mold used in a poured dish. The food itself may be decorated as in elaborately iced cakes, topped with ornamental sometimes sculptural consumables, drizzled with sauces, sprinkled with seeds, powders, or other toppings, or it may be accompanied by edible or inedible garnishes.
- Food preparation styles – see Food preparation techniques

=== Meals ===
Meals (outline) – cuisine is generally served in the form of a meal. A meal is an eating occasion that takes place at a certain time and includes specific, prepared food, or the food eaten on that occasion. The names used for specific meals in English vary greatly, depending on the speaker's culture, the time of day, or the size of the meal. Meals are composed of one or more courses, which in turn are composed of one or more dishes.

=== Meal structure in cuisines ===
Meal structure varies by culture. Here are some examples:

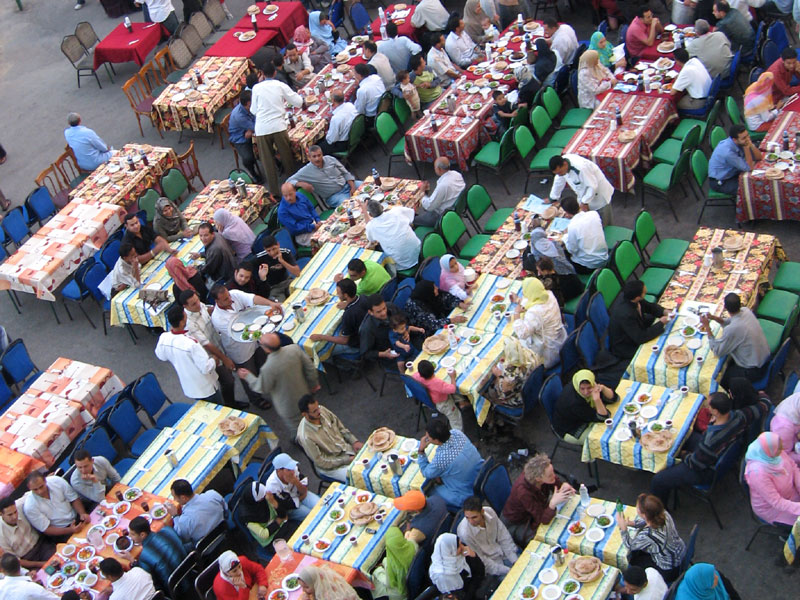
Ramadan dinner known as iftar in Cairo, Egypt

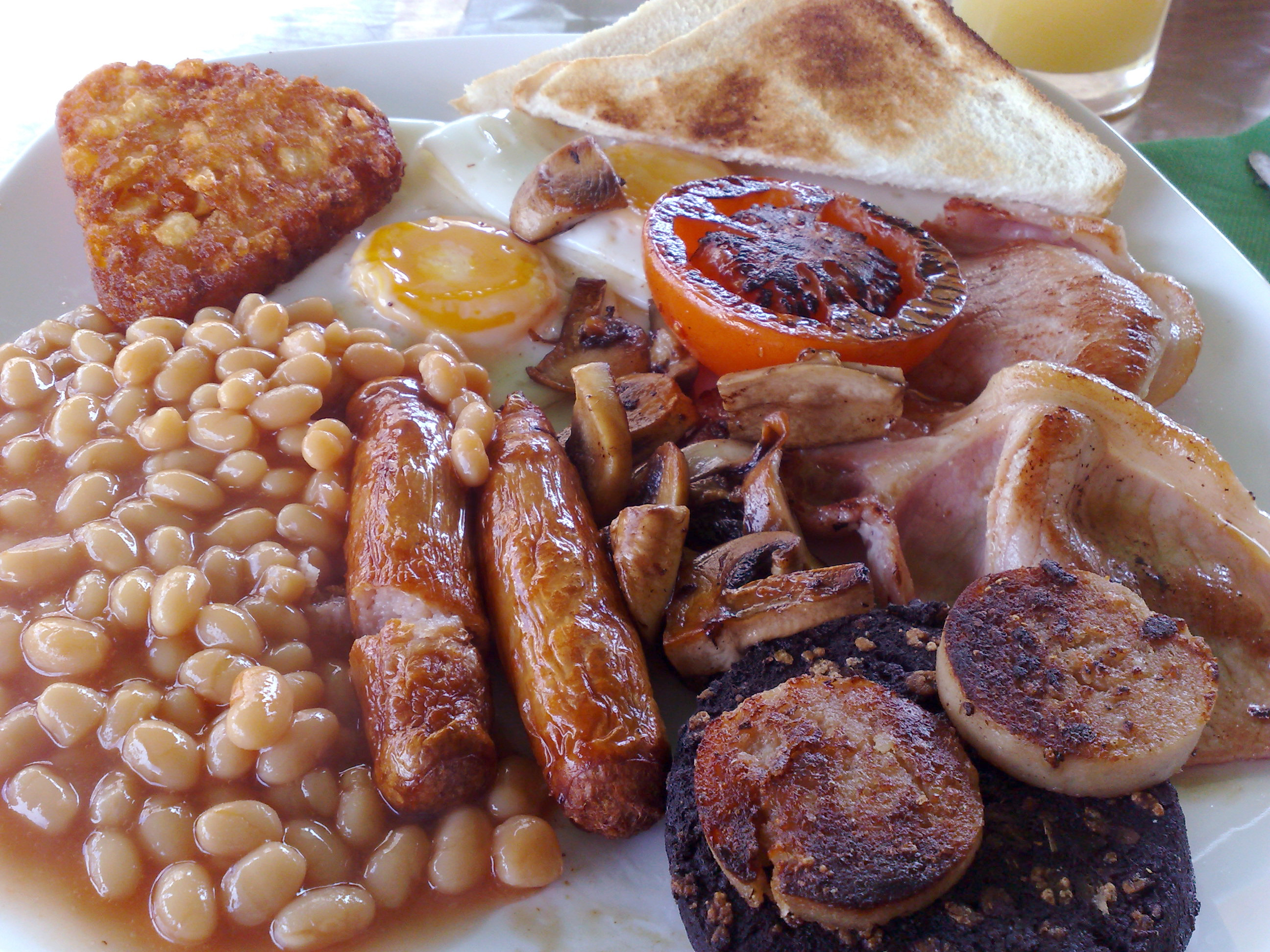
A full English breakfast with fried egg, sausage, white and black pudding, bacon, mushrooms, baked beans, hash browns, toast, and half a tomato

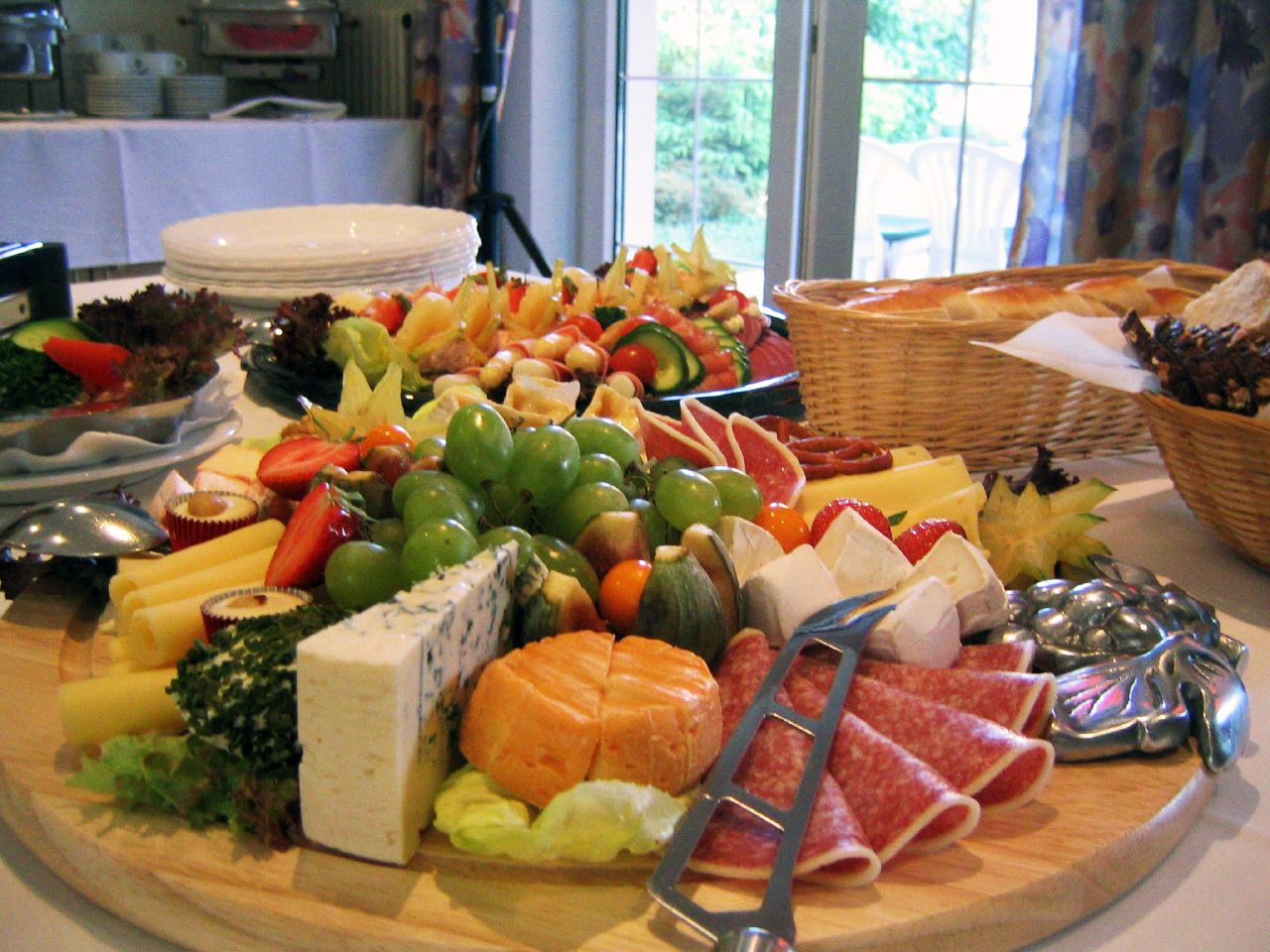
Typical German breakfast buffet

- Meal structure in Arab cuisine – includes breakfast, lunch, and dinner (including dessert). However, during Ramadan (9th month), fasting is paramount, and lasts from dawn to sunset. Each day during Ramadan, before dawn, many Muslims observe a pre-fast meal called the suhoor. After stopping a short time before dawn, Muslims begin the first prayer of the day, Fajr. At sunset, families hasten for the fast-breaking meal known as iftar.
- Meal structure in Bolivian cuisine – lunch (almuerzo) is the most important meal of the Bolivian day. Bolivians observe an afternoon tea time (té) similar to those in England. Dinner (la cena) is a lighter, much more informal affair than lunch.
- Meal structure in Danish cuisine – usually consists of a cold breakfast with coffee or tea, a cold lunch at work and a hot dinner at home with the family. Some also have a snack in the middle of the afternoon or in the late evening.
- Meal structure in Dutch cuisine – the Dutch eat at breakfast and lunch (which differ little from each other), tea time, and dinner (including dessert)
- Meal structure in English cuisine – Breakfast is traditional throughout England. Lower-middle-class and working-class people, especially from the North of England, the English Midlands, and Scotland, traditionally call their midday meal dinner and their evening meal (served around 6 pm) tea, whereas the upper social classes call the midday meal lunch (or luncheon), and the evening meal (served after 7 pm) dinner (if formal) or supper (often eaten later in the evening), with afternoon tea as a light meal typically eaten between 4 pm and 6 pm.
- Meal structure in French cuisine – breakfast (le petit déjeuner), lunch (le déjeuner), dinner (le dîner) and dessert. Beverages that precede a meal are called apéritifs (literally: that opens the appetite), and can be served with amuse-bouches (literally: mouth amuser). Those that end it are called digestifs.
- Meal structure in German cuisine – traditionally, the day starts with breakfast (frühstück), lunch (mittagessen) is the main meal, followed by a smaller dinner (abendessen or abendbrot) with dessert.
- Meal structure in Iranian cuisine – breakfast is called sobhāneh. Lunch and dinner (naahaar va shaam) are not distinguished in Persian. You can usually find tea brewing throughout the day in most Iranian homes.
- Meal structure in Italian cuisine – breakfast (colazione), lunch (pranzo), mid-afternoon snack (merenda), and dinner (cena)
- Meal structure in Moroccan cuisine

== History of cuisine ==
List of historical cuisines

- History of cooking – no known clear archeological evidence for the first cooking of food has survived. Most anthropologists believe that cooking fires began only about 250,000 years ago, when hearths started appearing.
- History of Asian cuisine
  - History of Chinese cuisine – marked by both variety and change. The archaeologist and scholar K.C. Chang says "Chinese people are especially preoccupied with food" and "food is at the center of, or at least it accompanies or symbolizes, many social interactions." Over the course of history, he says, "continuity vastly outweighs change." He explains basic organizing principles which go back to earliest times and give a continuity to the food tradition, principally that a normal meal is made up of fan（饭/飯） (grains and other starches) and cai（菜） (vegetable or meat dishes).
    - List of sources of Chinese culinary history
  - History of cuisine from the Indian subcontinent – consists of the cuisines of the Indian subcontinent, is rich and diverse. As a land that has experienced extensive immigration and intermingling through many millennia, the Indian subcontinent has benefited from numerous food influences. The diverse climate in the region, ranging from deep tropical to alpine, has also helped considerably broaden the set of ingredients readily available to the many schools of cookery in India.
  - History of Japanese cuisine
- History of Latin cuisine
- History of Middle Eastern cuisine
  - History of Iraqi cuisine – among the ancient texts discovered in Iraq is a Sumerian-Akkadian bilingual dictionary, recorded in cuneiform script on 24 stone tablets about 1900 BC. It lists terms in the two ancient Iraqi languages for over 800 different items of food and drink. Included are 20 different kinds of cheese, over 100 varieties of soup and 300 types of bread – each with different ingredients, filling, shape or size.

== See also ==
- Outline of food preparation
- Gastronomy
- Global cuisines
- Regional cuisine
