= Terakado =

Terakado (written: 寺門 or 寺神戸) is a Japanese surname. Notable people with the surname include:

- Jimon Terakado (寺門 義人, born 1962), Japanese comedian
- Ryo Terakado (寺神戸 亮, born 1961), Japanese classical violinist and conductor
- Terakado Seiken (寺門 静軒, 1796 – 1868), Japanese writer and Confucian scholar

== See also ==
- 16528 Terakado, a main-belt asteroid
