= History of meat consumption in Japan =

The history of meat consumption in Japan is relatively short. Meat products, referring to non-maritime animals, were historically not developed as part of Japanese cuisine due to the influence of Buddhist vegetarianism, political idealism, and scarcity. As a result, Japan has the shortest history of eating meat compared to other Asian countries. Meat consumption patterns vary regionally in Japan, which are often attributed to historical development and background.

== History ==
The habit of eating meat, or carnivorism, became common throughout Japan after the 1868 Meiji Restoration. However, throughout and before the Edo period that preceded the Meiji Restoration, small amounts of meat, including beef, pork, and wild game were consumed.

=== Pre-Edo period ===
In 675 AD, Emperor Tenmu imposed a ban on the consumption of meat of chicken, cows, dogs, horses, and monkeys, as well as small fry fish between April 1 and September 30 of each year. Tenmu, a well-known sponsor of Buddhism, was likely influenced by the Buddhist principle of transmigration, that implied a compassion for all living beings, as well as ideas of purity related to blood and dead bodies rooted in Shintoism. However the fact that the ban did not mention deer or wild boar, the two most commonly eaten meats in Japan, suggests that influences other than Buddhist morality helped to shape it. The ban, mentioned in Nihon Shoki, was strengthened by subsequent rulers, including bans by Empress Genshō and Emperor Shōmu in 721 and 736, respectively.

After Tenmu's edict, occupations such as tanning hides and slaughtering animals came to be highly stigmatized and were carried out by members of the hereditary classes known as eta (distinct from the hinin that compose the larger group today known as burakumin). For centuries, members of this class were the only ones who ate meat openly; this was often seen as a reinforcing cause of their oppressed social status.

Despite this, mentions of eating meat, particularly wild boar and deer, which were not included in Emperor Tenmu's ban, persisted from the 8th century into the 16th century. The consumption of game meat was centered in the mountains of northern Japan, but meat was also available in markets in more urban areas. Because, historically, the raising of animals as livestock for eating was not developed in Japan, most meat eaten was hunted rather than farmed, although this focused largely on fish and fowl. Mammals were increasingly hunted by the new bushi warrior class; descriptions of their lives mention them feasting on, among others, deer, wild boars, bears, raccoon dogs (tanuki), serows, rabbits, and otters.

==== Poultry ====
Chickens had been introduced to Japan from China with the advent of rice farming, although duck breeding, which was present in China, was not introduced. Chicken meat was prohibited under Emperor Tenmu's original 675 AD edict, although birds such as pheasants and wild ducks were not. Of the chicken breeds considered native to Japan, 17 have been designated as a Natural Monument of Japan.

Eating chicken eggs became taboo in the 17th century; around this time, areas in southwestern Japan began raising ducks for eggs as a replacement for the now-taboo chicken eggs.

The number of egg farms increased in Japan after World War II with a peak in 1955 of approximately 4.5 million farms, but then rapidly decreased afterwards.

=== Medieval period ===
In the 13th century, some shrines, including Suwa Shrine in Shinano Province (present-day Nagano Prefecture) and Utsunomiya Shrine in Shimotsuke Province (present-day Tochigi Prefecture), accepted offerings of meat, particularly of deer or other hunted animals. Suwa Shrine in particular both adopted and created Buddhist doctrine that not only allowed meat sacrifices but legitimized them as "compassionate killing" that affected the salvation of the souls of the killed animals.

==== Foreign influence ====
Western missionaries, particularly those from Portugal and Spain, began arriving in Japan in the mid-16th century. As conversions to Christianity increased, so did meat consumption, as the new Christians were not obliged to follow the Buddhist edict against meat-eating. Particularly in Kyushu, where the Nanban trade and culture began and flourished, the consumption of meat increased significantly, with accounts of armies moving live pigs onto battlefields in order to feed soldiers. This practice continued until it was banned by Toyotomi Hideyoshi.

=== Edo period ===
References to meat-eating were often referred to in metaphor, including describing red meat as 'winter peony' and meat more broadly as 'mountain whale'.

Cookbooks written in the early Edo period, including the 1643 Ryōri monogatari, contain recipes for the animals listed above, as well as dogs; however, it has been argued that these recipes constitute a remnant from the earlier medieval period, and gave way to strict, Tokugawa-ordered vegetarianism. Tokugawa Tsunayoshi, for example, issued a series of edicts prohibiting the killing and maltreatment of any animal, with a particular focus on dogs. During his reign from 1680 to 1709, he issued the same instructions at least 66 times, suggesting they were not widely obeyed.

The essays Edo Hanjoki (江戸繁昌記, Notes of Prosperity in Edo) by Terakado Seiken, published in 1832, describe the flourishing number of shops selling 'mountain whale' (the Japanese boar).

=== Meiji period ===
Following the 1868 Meiji Restoration, meat-eating rapidly became accepted in society. Historian Nobi Shōji proposed that this quick uptake could have only taken place because of the extant customs of eating meat in Japan.

The Meiji government announced the lifting the ban on eating meat in 1872. This was, at least in part, inspired by a desire to increase meat consumption to boost military power and national prosperity; meat-eating was considered a symbol of bunmei-kaika (civilization and enlightenment) and Westernization. The decision to repeal the ban faced some resistance; in one notable incident, ten monks attempted to break into the Imperial Palace, claiming that foreign influence was leading many Japanese to eat meat, which they believed was destroying the soul of the Japanese people. Several monks were killed during the break-in attempt, and the others were arrested.

However the culture of meat-eating, particularly in public and by non-eta Japanese people, had already begun, although it tended to be in areas, such as port cities, with large numbers of foreigners. The first steamed beef restaurant was opened in Irifune-cho, a predominantly foreign part of Yokohama in 1862. The first gyunabe restaurant opened in Shibatsuyutsuki-cho as demand for beef increased; in 1869, a sukiyaki restaurant opened in Motomachi, Kobe.

==== Effects of the military ====
During the Sino-Japanese War, beef was supplied to the military for soldiers' rations, and therefore became scarce for civilian consumption. At this time, pork started to become cheaper and more popular, leading to greater consumption and the development of pork-based dishes such as tonkatsu.

A Japanese abattoir c. 1930

=== Post-war period ===
Meat consumption increased more than seven-fold after the end of World War II. An analysis of the 2019 Japan National Health and Nutrition Survey showed that red meat was in excess of the upper limit of the planetary health diet the modern Japanese diet; the highest excess was in respondents in their 40s and declined with increasing age.

== Regional differences ==
Western Japan, also known as Kansai, is conceptualized as a "beef area", whereas eastern Japan, also known as Kantō, is considered a "pork area", based on the most commonly purchased meat-type.

Historically, the Hikone clan, which was based in the Kinki region near Kyoto, had the only authorized beef production during the Edo period (1603–1868).

=== Hokkaido ===
On the island of Hokkaido, the percentage of pork purchases is even greater than that of Kantō. Hokkaido is also one of the few places in Japan where mutton is eaten; about half of all imported mutton is consumed in Hokkaido.

=== Okinawa ===
Okinawa Prefecture, previously the Ryukyu Kingdom, has historically had a different relationship with meat and diet compared to the more northern parts of Japan due to its status as a vassal of China. Pigs were first introduced to the Ryukyu Kingdom by Chinese immigrants in 1392; however they failed to become a widespread part of the Ryukyu diet and culture due to insufficient food supply for the pigs themselves. Pork is an important part of the Okinawan food culture, particularly in its relationship to sweet potatoes. Compared to mainland Japan, where many people follow a vegetarian diet for religious occasions, pork is included in dishes served at funerals. Among pork dishes from Okinawa include preserved pig's blood, pig ear prepared in the style of sashimi in a vinegar and miso salad with vegetables, and nakami suimono, a mushroom soup made with pig stomach or intestine. Traditional Okinawan preparation of pork includes the careful removal of subcutaneous fat in a process of boiling called akanuki.

Okinawa Prefecture is one of the few places in Japan where goat meat is part of the traditional food culture. The typical use of goat meat in Okinawa is either as goat soup or goat sashimi.

== Present ==
Household meat consumption in Japan did not surpass that of fresh fish consumption until 2007.

Despite predictions that meat consumption would slow in 2019 due to decreased population growth and an economic slump, the amount of meat consumed in Japan in 2020 increased significantly, possibly as a result of the COVID-19 pandemic.

=== Wild game ===
A survey conducted in 2013 showed that only 3-15% of Japanese consumers had ever eaten wild game meat. Of these, the most commonly consumed meat was Japanese boar (猪; inoshishi), which was exempted from the meat-eating ban imposed in 675 AD by Emperor Tenmu.

=== Wagyu culture ===
Although Japan is a meat-importing country, with about half of all meat coming from imported sources as of 2022, Japan is known as a producer of Wagyu as a luxury item.

== See also ==
- Animal welfare and rights in Japan
