= Japanese cuisine in São Paulo =

Culinary traditions of Japanese in São Paulo

Japanese cuisine has existed in São Paulo since the beginning of the 20th century, when Japanese workers began immigrating to Brazil to work on coffee farms. Japanese Brazilians adapted their native cuisine to incorporate the types of food available in Brazil, such as replacing rice with corn or cassava.

Until the 1980s, Japanese cuisine was not popular in São Paulo outside the Japanese Brazilian community. By the 1990s, Japanese restaurants were available throughout the city, including a type of fast food sushi restaurant called a temakeria that is unique to Brazil.

== Historical context ==
Immigration to Brazil began in 1530. Large areas of undeveloped land created a need for migrants throughout Brazil in the early twentieth century. In 1907, the government of São Paulo signed a contract with the Empire Emigration Company to bring Japanese migrants to work in the city's new coffee business. The first wave of Japanese immigrants arrived in Brazil on the ship Kasato Maru. After a difficult journey, they landed at the port of Santos and came to the Inn of Immigrants in São Paulo mainly to work on coffee farms.

One of the major problems Japanese migrants experienced in Brazil was the difference in food. Their first meal on Brazilian soil was rice and beans. Brazilian rice was different from what they had in Japan. The consistency was soft and was not sticky in the way they were used to. The prominent use of lard, corn flour, cassava flour and garlic in Brazilian cuisine also seemed strange to the newly arrived Japanese families. During their first months in Brazil it was hard for the Japanese workers to find items they were familiar with like fish and vegetables because they were not a part of the local diet.

For a period of time meals for the Japanese immigrants consisted of rice and cod which is similar to the Brazilian cuisine. They did not know how to desalt cod and initially prepared it over hot coals. The rice was cooked in boiling water and served with coffee in the mornings. Over time, the high cost of rice led to it being replaced by cookies made of cornmeal, cassava flour and corn to complement the coffee. Preserves, which are fundamental to Japanese cuisine, did not exist in Brazil at that time. The Japanese adapted by pickling local fruits like papaya. They later began manufacturing miso (salty soybean paste) and shōyu (soy sauce).

Eventually some of the Japanese moved from the coffee farms to the capital in search of a better life. They concentrated in the Liberdade, specifically in Conde and Sazedas, which had cheaper rent and was close to the city center. Japanese families often rented out rooms to outside tenants as a source of additional income. The neighborhood's central location and the city's public transit system made job searching relatively easy. The houses in Liberdade had basements completely independent of the rest of the home, which would create future Japanese holiday food traditions.

The Japanese introduced several fruits and vegetables that were not traditionally part of Brazilian cooking. They created greenbelts by cultivating areas previously considered infertile and bringing a gradual change in Brazilian eating habits. According to Medina, Japanese foods are categorized by cooking method: yakimono (at grid), nimono (cooked), mushimono (steamed), nabemono (cooked to table), agemono (breaded and fried) and sushi (raw). Rice can accompany each of these foods. The dishes served are varied in Japanese cuisine and served at the same time. This is very different from the Brazilian style of dining before the Japanese immigrants' arrival.

Japanese cuisine became popular in Brazil in the 1980s, particularly in the national capital of Brasília, which was home to more than 300,000 people of Japanese descent. However, it was only in the 1990s that Brazilian interest in Japanese cuisine spread throughout the country, mainly because of its reputation as healthy, balanced and tasty. Now Sushi, rice covered with slices of raw fish, is so well known that it can be found in Brazilian buffets, steakhouses, supermarkets, and retail shops.

Data collected from ABRESI (Brazilian Association of Food, Hospitality and Tourism) in 2013 in São Paulo showed that there were 500–600 Japanese restaurants, producing 400,000 sushi meals per day. Thus, Ishige-san says that Brazil was one of the first foreign countries where Japanese cuisine became popular. "Single, refined, fast, natural, gorgeous, modern and low calorie"; so Medina defines Japanese cuisine.

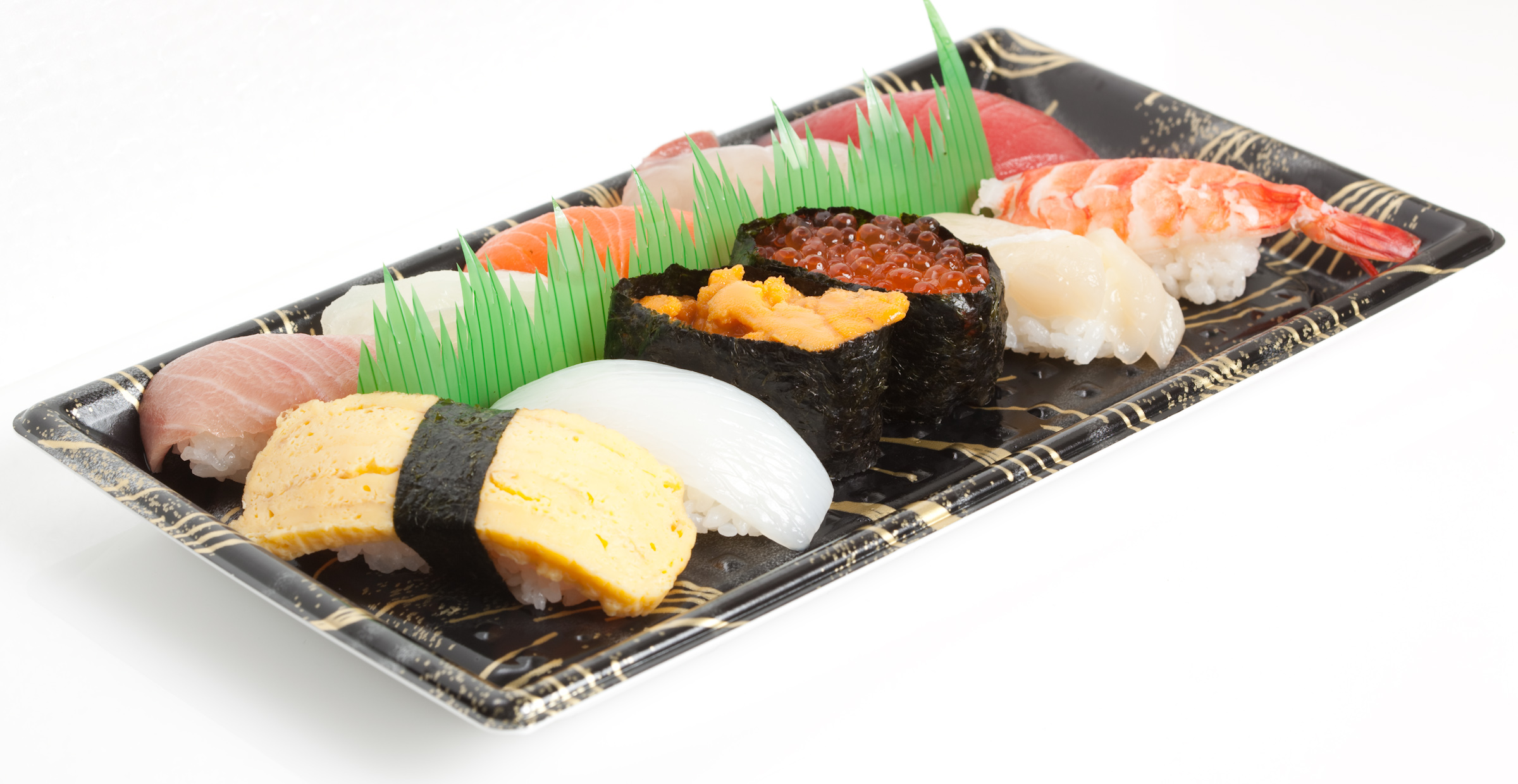
Tray of sushi

== Japanese food in present Brazil ==
As Proença says, restaurants offering food from other countries tend to make changes and adjustments to the foods and may even create new versions for certain dishes, preserving some unique features. These changes and adjustments take place until the dishes suit consumer tastes. Examples of these modifications are the hot rolls (sushi, breaded and fried).

However, this popularity was strengthened with the opening of the first restaurant with option buffet free (caster). At reasonable prices, Brazilians today can experience sushi, sashimi, tempuras, shimeji and other Japanese dishes. The first restaurant opened with this system was in the early 90s, in Ipanema, Rio de Janeiro, named Mariko. In 1997, it was the turn of São Paulo, in the Itaim Bibi area in the Aoyama. In Japan there is no service carvery; the closest to this model is the takehodai (fixed price).

Another success, which also does not exist in Japan, is the temakerias, a fast food service that offers sushi wrapped in algae and with various fillings. The first was opened in Temakeria Vila Olimpia in 2003, the Temaki Express. Since then a taste for temakerias has appeared in São Paulo among those increasingly looking for this kind of service.

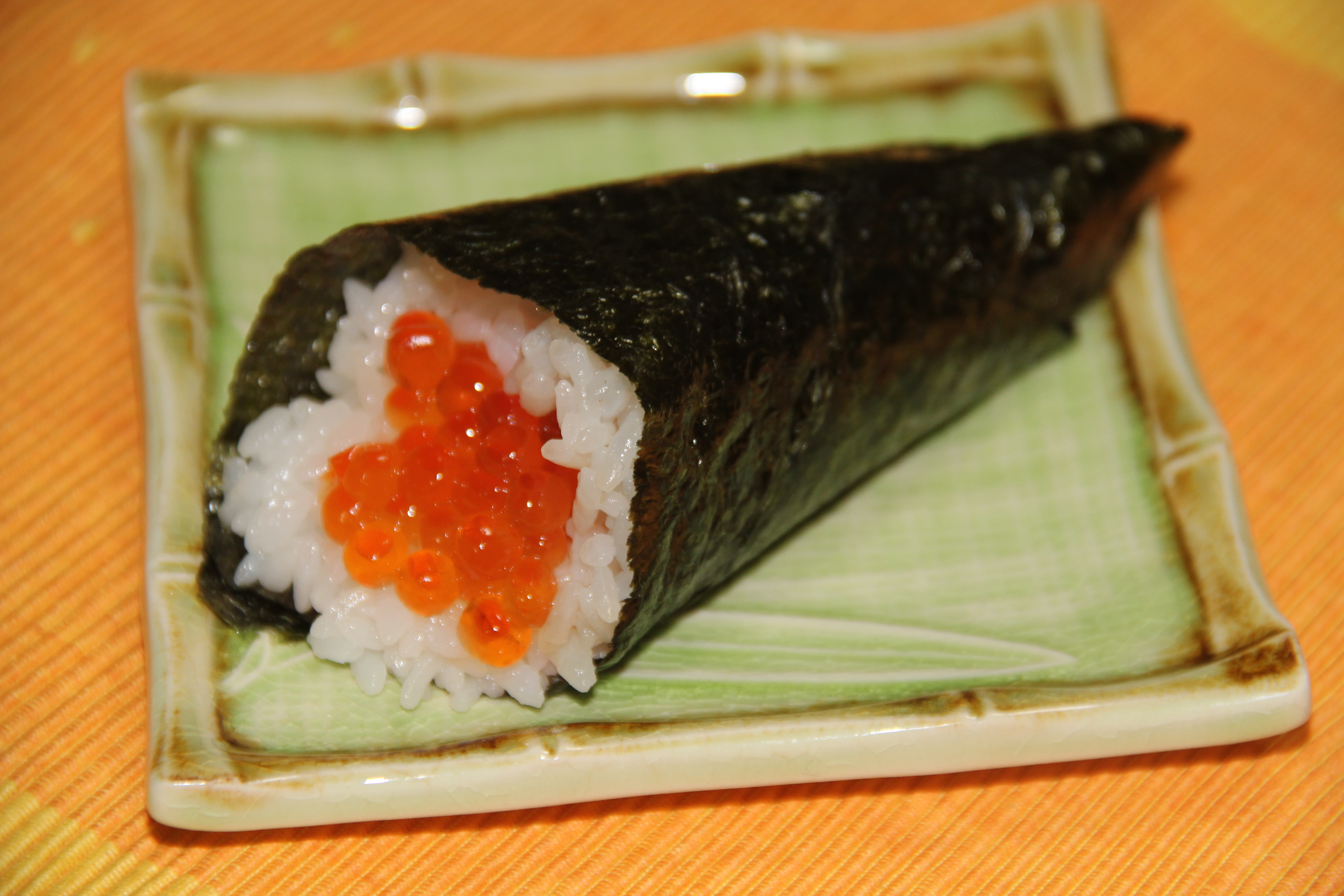
Temaki

== Japanese Brazilian cuisine globally ==
Japanese Brazilian Cuisine may have originated in São Paulo, but its influences extend on a global scale. Moving into Europe, Japanese Brazilian cuisine has recently started to open restaurants.
