= History of Japanese cuisine =

This article traces the history of cuisine in Japan. Foods and food preparation by the early Japanese Neolithic settlements can be pieced together from archaeological studies, and reveals paramount importance of rice and seafood since early times.

The Kofun period (3rd to 7th centuries) is shrouded in uncertainty. Some entries in Japan's earliest written chronicles hint at a picture of food habits from the time of the formation of the imperial dynasty. When Buddhism became widely accepted with the rise of the Soga clan, a taboo on eating meat (especially mammals) became common practice, although wild game was still hunted by impoverished mountain people, and would be eaten by townspeople when the opportunity arose.

Treatises on ceremony, tax documents, and works of fiction allows one to make a list of food ingredients used, and basic preparation methods in the Heian period. However, anything like recipes from the Middle Ages are a rare commodity in Japan or any country.

Records throughout Middle Ages may give some idea of the dishes being enjoyed, but do not give details such as to provide accurate recipes.

Once Japan entered the modern Edo period, there were rich records of foods and cuisine from commoners (i.e., non-samurai), who were largely literate, and produced a great deal of wood-block printed literature.

== Early history (before 794) ==
Following the Jōmon period (14,000–300 BCE), Japanese society shifted from semi-sedentary hunter-gatherer lifestyle to an agricultural society. This was the period in which rice cultivation began, having been introduced by China around the third century BCE. Rice was commonly boiled plain and called gohan or meshi, and, as cooked rice has since been the preferred staple of the meal, the terms are used as synonyms for the word "meal". Peasants often mixed millet with rice, especially in mountainous regions where rice did not proliferate.

During the Kofun period (300 to 538 CE), Chinese culture was introduced into Japan from Korea. As such, Buddhism became influential on Japanese culture. After the 6th century, Japan directly pursued the imitation of Chinese culture of the Tang dynasty (618 to 907). It was this influence that marked the taboos on the consumption of meat in Japan. In 675 CE, Emperor Tenmu decreed a prohibition on the consumption of cattle, horses, dogs, monkeys, and chickens during the 4th-9th months of the year; to break the law would mean a death sentence. Monkey was eaten prior to this time but only in a ritualistic style for medicinal purposes. Chickens were often domesticated as pets, while cattle and horses were rare and more valued for providing labor and transportation. A cow or horse would be ritually sacrificed on the first day of rice paddy cultivation, a ritual introduced from China. Emperor Tenmu's decree, however, did not ban the consumption of deer or wild boar, which were important to the Japanese diet at that time.

== Heian period (794-1185) ==
The Heian Period (794 to 1185) in the 8th century saw many additional decrees made by emperors and empresses banning the killing of any animals. In 752 CE, Empress Kōken decreed a ban on fishing but made a promise that adequate rice would be given to fishermen whose livelihood would have otherwise been destroyed. In 927 CE, regulations were enacted that stated that any government official or member of nobility that ate meat was deemed unclean for three days and could not participate in Shinto observances at the imperial court.

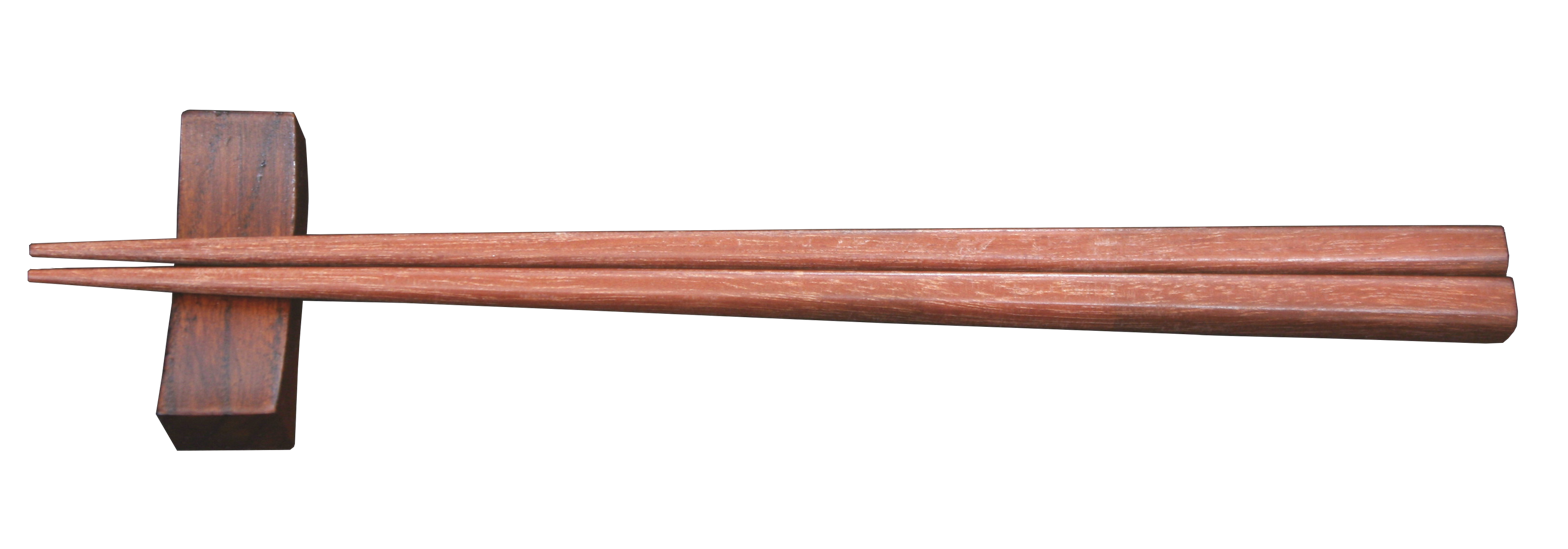
Chopsticks on a chopstick rest

It was also the influence of Chinese cultures through Korea that brought chopsticks to Japan early in this period. Chopsticks at this time were used by nobility at banquets; they were not used as everyday utensils however, as hands were still commonly used to eat. Metal spoons were also used during the 8th and 9th centuries, but only by the nobility. Dining tables were also introduced to Japan at this time. Commoners used a legless, rough-carved table called a oshiki, while nobility used a lacquered table with legs called a zen. Each person used his own table. Lavish banquets for the nobility would have multiple tables for each individual based upon the number of dishes presented.

Along with the addition of chopsticks, Chinese tea was also introduced to Japan during the Heian Period. Although first recorded in Japan during the Nara Period (710 to 784), tea grew popular after Buddhist Monks Saicho and Kukai traveled back to Japan from China bearing tea seeds and leaves in 805 CE. Tea became popular in aristocratic circles before spreading to commoners, and as farmers began to commercially grow and farm tea plants around the time of 805 CE, tea began to explode in popularity.

Upon the decline of the Tang dynasty in the 9th century, Japan made a move toward its individuality in culture and cuisine. The abandonment of the spoon as a dining utensil – which was retained in Korea – is one of the marked differences, and commoners were now eating with chopsticks as well. Trade continued with China and Korea but influence en masse from outside Japan would not be seen again until the 19th century. The 10th and 11th centuries marked a level of refinement of cooking and etiquette found in the culture of the Heian nobility. Experienced cooks began to develop their own unique recipes rather than simply copy foreign dishes. Court banquets were common and lavish; garb for nobility during these events remained in the Chinese style which differentiated them from the plain clothes of commoners.

The dishes consumed after the 9th century included grilled fish and meat (yakimono), simmered food (nimono), steamed foods (mushimono), soups made from chopped vegetables, fish or meat (atsumono), jellied fish (nikogori) simmered with seasonings, sliced raw fish served in a vinegar sauce (namasu), vegetables, seaweed or fish in a strong dressing (aemono), and pickled vegetables (tsukemono) that were cured in salt to cause lactic fermentation. Other snacks included fruit, nuts, and rice cakes, which were made with rice and different vegetables. Oil and fat were avoided almost universally in cooking. Sesame oil was used, but rarely, as it was of great expense to produce.

Documents from the Heian nobility note that fish and wild fowl were common fare along with vegetables. These Heian nobles ate twice a day, once at 10 AM and once at 4 PM. Their banquet settings consisted of a bowl of rice and soup, along with chopsticks, a spoon, and three seasonings which were salt, vinegar and hishio, which was a fermentation of soybeans, wheat, sake and salt. A fourth plate was present for mixing the seasonings to desired flavor for dipping the food.

The four types of food present at a banquet consisted of dried foods (himono), fresh foods (namamono), fermented or dressed food (kubotsuki), and desserts (kashi). Dried fish and fowl were thinly sliced (e.g. salted salmon, pheasant, steamed and dried abalone, dried and grilled octopus), while fresh fish, shellfish and fowl were sliced raw in vinegar sauce or grilled (e.g. carp, sea bream, salmon, trout, pheasant). Kubotsuki consisted of small balls of fermented sea squirt, fish or giblets along with jellyfish and aemono. Desserts would have included Chinese cakes, and a variety of fruits and nuts including pine nuts, dried chestnuts, acorns, jujube, pomegranate, peach, apricot, persimmon and citrus. The meal would be ended with sake.

== Kamakura period (1192-1333) ==
The Kamakura period marked a large political change in Japan. Prior to the Kamakura period, the samurai were little more than guards and enforcers of the nobility, who monopolized political power. In time, the samurai co-opted their masters to usurp control of Japan's legal and political system, with a military dictatorship being established in 1192 in Kamakura. Once the position of power had been exchanged, the role of the court banquets changed. The court cuisine which had prior to this time emphasized flavor and nutritional aspects changed to a highly ceremonial and official role.

Minamoto no Yoritomo, the first shōgun, made a point of punishing samurai who followed the earlier showy banquet style of the nobility. An official banquet, the ōban, was instituted for high-ranking samurai and shogunate officials. The ōban originally referred to a luncheon on festival days attended by soldiers and guards during the Heian period and was considered an important practice to the warrior class. The menu usually consisted of simple dried abalone, jellyfish aemono, pickled ume called umeboshi, salt and vinegar for seasoning, and rice. Later in the period, the honzen-ryōri banquet became popularized.

The cuisine of the samurai came distinctly from their peasant roots. The meals prepared emphasized simplicity while being substantial. The cuisine avoided refinement, ceremony and luxury, and shed all further Chinese influence. One specific example is the change from wearing traditional Chinese garb to a distinct clothing style based on commoners' garb, but with refinements to emphasize the wearer's importance. This style evolved into the kimono by the end of the Middle Ages.

The Buddhist vegetarian philosophy strengthened during the Kamakura period as it began to spread to the peasants. Those who were involved in the trade of slaughtering animals for food or leather came under legal discrimination. Those practicing this trade were considered in opposition to the Buddhist philosophy of not taking life, while under the Shinto philosophy they were considered defiled. This discrimination intensified and eventually led to the creation of a separate caste, the burakumin.

== Sengoku, Edo, Meiji, and Showa Jidai ==
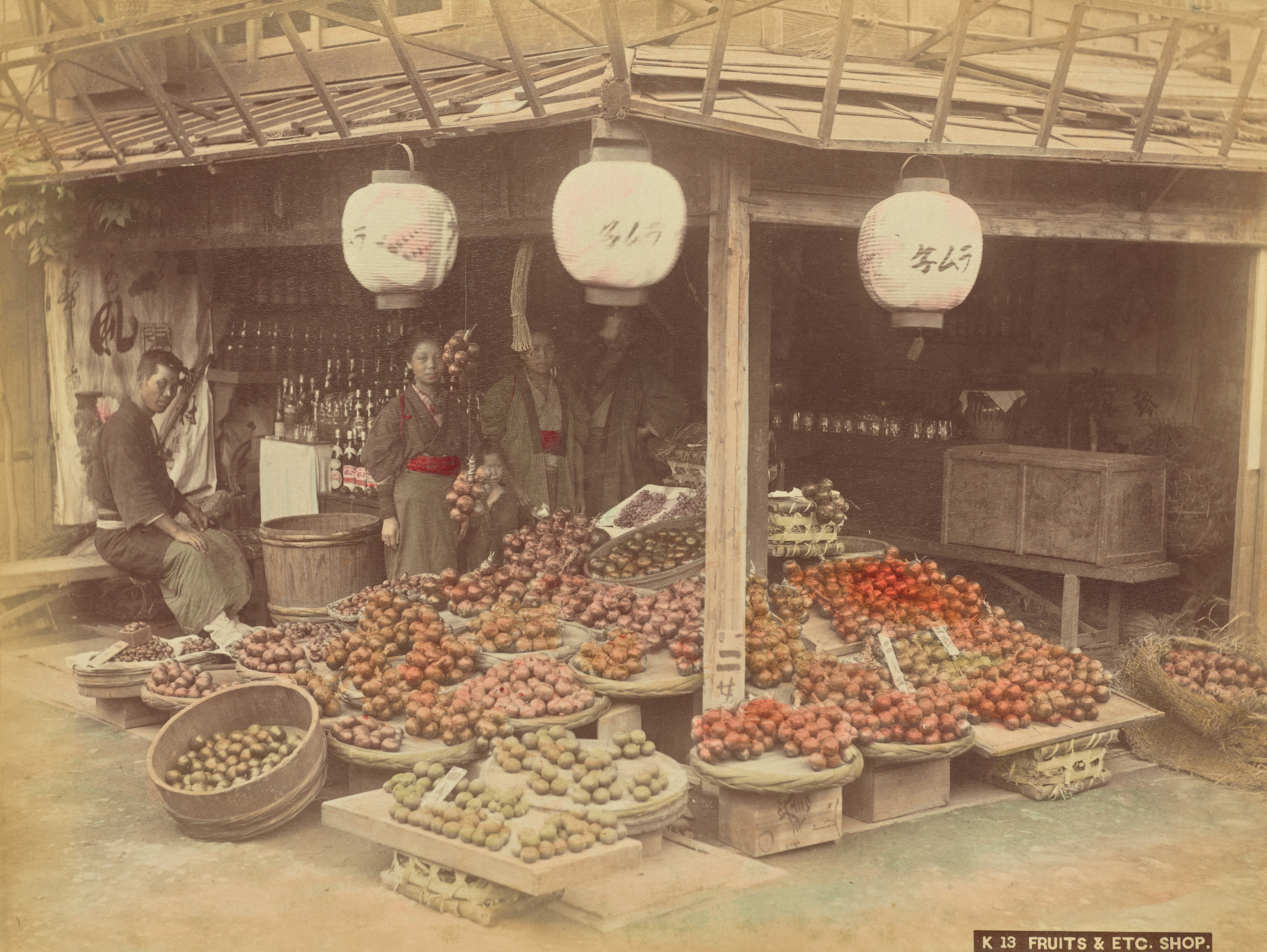
A fruit market stand in Meiji-era Japan

Jesuit Catholic Portuguese missionary João Rodrigues said that Japanese refused to eat lard, hens, duck, pigs, cow, horse, and ass, and refused to eat their own livestock and only sometimes hunted wild animals during feasts, in contrast to the Chinese who ate geese, hens, domestic duck, bacon, lard, pork, cow, horse and ass. Catholic Christians visiting Japan were accused of eating dogs, horses and cattle by Japanese Buddhist monks. The book "comparison between European and Japanese Cultures" was written by Luís Fróis (1532–1597), a Jesuit Father in 1585. He said "Europeans relish hens, quails, pies, and blancmanges, Japanese prefer wild dogs, cranes, large monkeys, cats, and uncooked seaweed [for eating] ... We do not eat dog meat but beef; Japanese do not eat beef but dog meat as medicine". the Japanese also ate raw, sliced boar meat, unlike Europeans who cooked it in stew. Animal milk like cow milk was despised and abhorred and meat eating was avoided by the Japanese in the 19th century. When one Japanese, Marsukara wanted to feed cow milk to babies after he was told western babies were fed it, he imported from Shanghai milking equipment at the French consul's advice and purchased Nagasaki cows. He never drank it himself. Beef was not eaten as regular food in Japan until the Meiji restoration. Meat eating was forbidden by Buddhism in Japan. Meat eating was an abhorred western practice, according to one Samurai family's daughter who never ate meat. Shintoism and Buddhism both contributed to the vegetarian diet of medieval Japanese while 0.1 ounces of meat was the daily amount consumed by the average Japanese in 1939. Japan lacked arable land for livestock so meat eating was outlawed several times by Japan's rulers. In 675 a law was passed stating that from late spring to early autumn, dog, chicken, monkey and beef meat was not allowed for that period of time. Other bans were implemented. Japan mostly got meat from hunting wild animals but wild animals like boar and deer decreased as farmers cut down forests for farms since the population grew. Japan started adopting meat based diets from Europeans like the Dutch who were taller than them in the 18th century and then when the Meiji emperor ate meat in public on 24 January 1872. Then Japan started importing Korean beef with a 13 times increase in Tokyo's beef consumption in 5 years. The average Japanese conscript was weak, with a minimum height at 4 feet 11 inches; 16% of conscripts were shorter than that height and were generally thin. Japan needed to boost its army strength at the time when it was modernizing. Japan then saw American soldiers eating bacon, steaks and hamburgers after the Second World War when America occupied Japan. Japan's McDonald's chief Den Fujita said "If we eat hamburgers for a thousand years, we will become blond. And when we become blond we can conquer the world." Beef was however eaten as medicine in both China and Japan as a special exemption to the ban before the 19th century. The ban originated in the 10th century AD.

== See also ==
- History of sushi
- History of meat consumption in Japan
