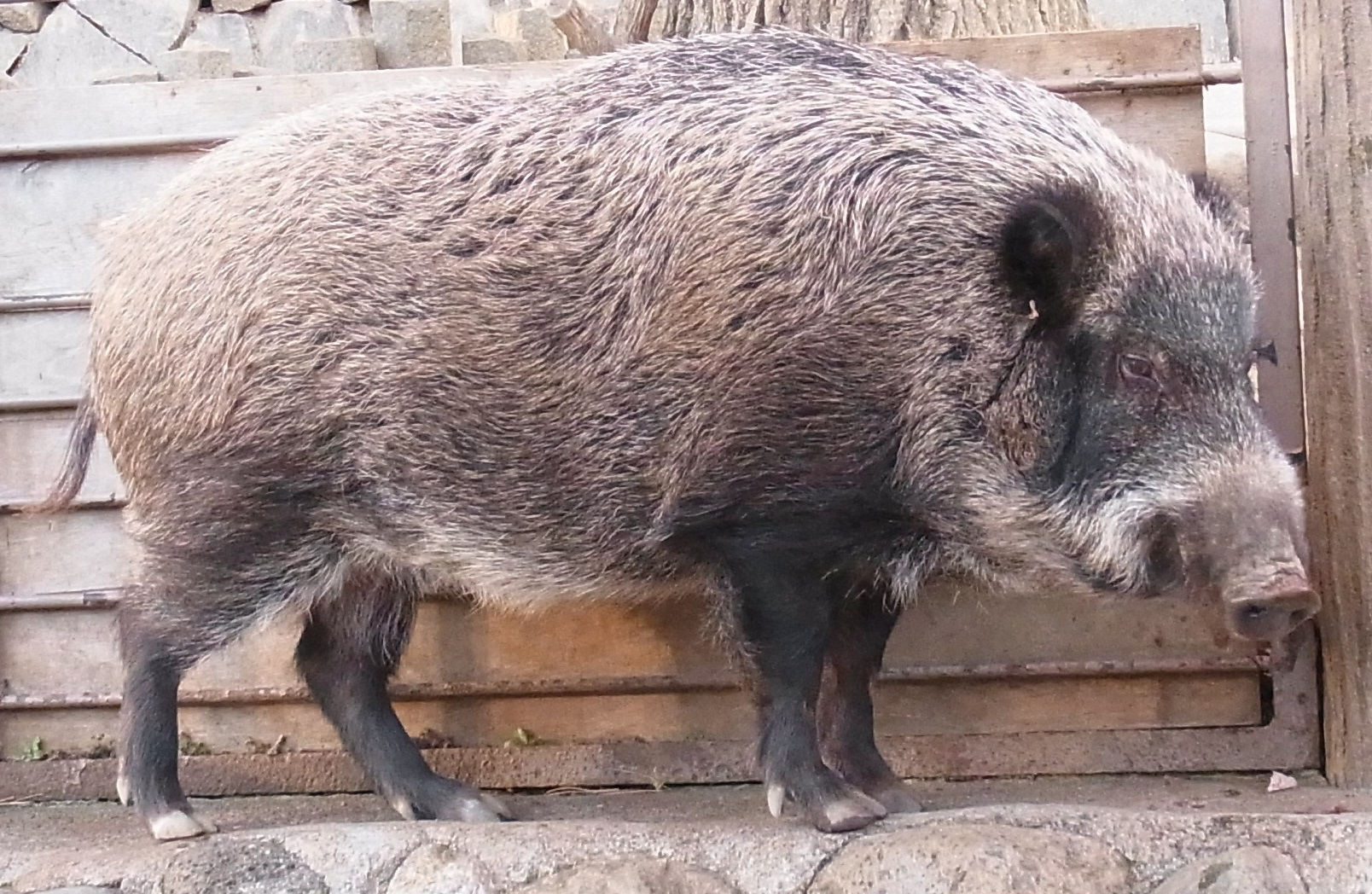
- S. s. leucomystax, Tama zoo

Scientific classification
- Kingdom: Animalia
- Phylum: Chordata
- Class: Mammalia
- Order: Artiodactyla
- Family: Suidae
- Genus: Sus
- Species: S. scrofa
- Subspecies: S. s. leucomystax

Trinomial name
- Sus scrofa leucomystax Temminck, 1842

Synonyms
- Species synonymy: japonica (Nehring, 1885); nipponicus (Heude, 1899)

= Japanese boar =

Subspecies of wild boar

The Japanese boar (Sus scrofa leucomystax), also known as the white-moustached pig, Inoshishi (Kanji: 猪; Higarana: いのしし), nihon-inoshishi (ニホンイノシシ), or yama kujira (山鯨, lit. "mountain whale"), is a subspecies of wild boar native to all of Japan, apart from Hokkaido and the Ryukyu Islands.

== Taxonomy ==
It is a small, almost maneless, yellowish-brown subspecies with distinctive white whiskers extending from the corners of the mouth to the cheeks.

== Predators ==
In many areas of Japan, humans are the only predator for wild boars. The Japanese black bear is usually herbivorous, but they can eat livestock. The omnivorous Ussuri brown bear adapted to hunt wild boars. Its former natural predator, the Japanese wolf, is believed to have gone extinct. The Japan Wolf Association has been lobbying to reintroduce wolves into the country to restore the ecological balance which would curb the ballooning populations of deer and boars. However, there is strong public opposition to this plan.

== Presence following the Fukushima nuclear disaster ==
After the March 2011 Fukushima nuclear disaster, Japanese boar descended from the mountains to towns and cities within the exclusion zone that had been temporarily evacuated. DNA analyses of individual boar that were carried out a few years later showed that the species thrived there and bred with escaped domestic pigs, resulting in the emergence of boar-pig hybrids. Compared to the escaped domestic pigs, the wild boar were better suited to living in the region. Over time, genes inherited from the domestic pigs will gradually disappear as hybrid pigs breed with the more numerous purebred wild boar.

== Culture ==
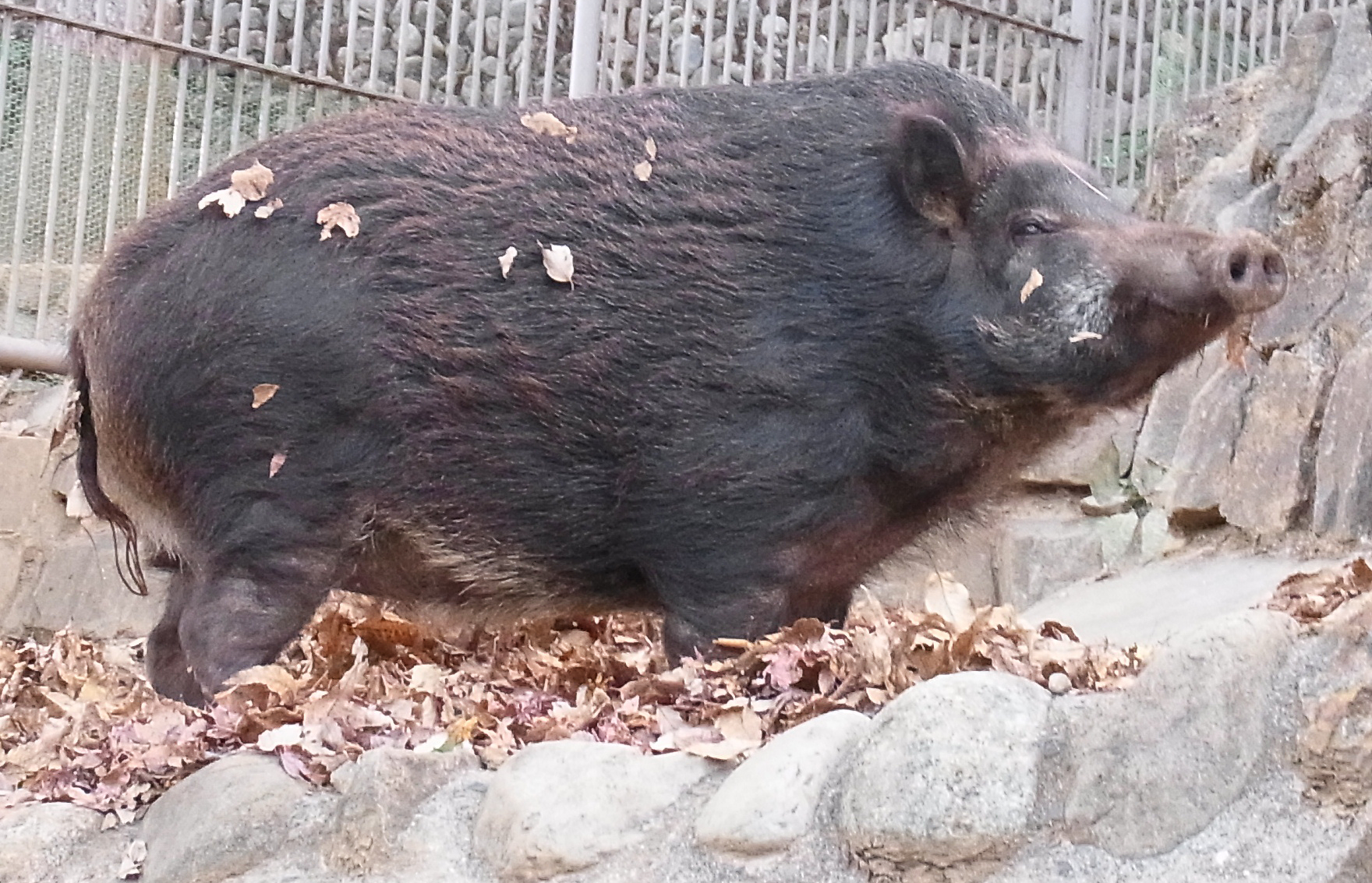
Japanese boar at Tama Zoo

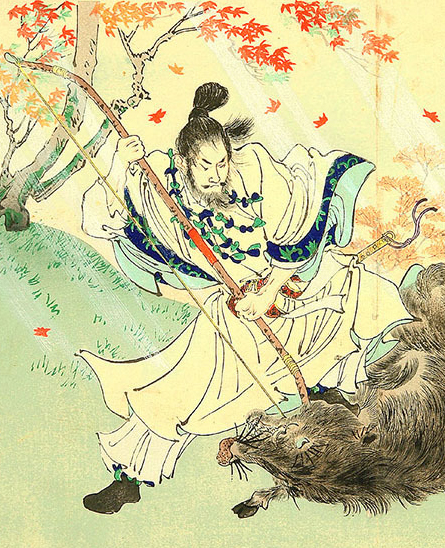
Emperor Yūryaku hunts a wild boar

It features prominently in Japanese culture, where it is widely seen as a fearsome and reckless animal, to the point that several words and expressions in Japanese referring to recklessness include references to boars. The boar is the last animal of the oriental zodiac, with people born during the year of the Pig being said to embody the boar-like traits of determination and impetuosity.

Boars are also seen as symbols of fertility and prosperity. The animal's link to prosperity was illustrated by its inclusion on the ¥10 note during the Meiji period, and it was once believed that a man could become wealthy by keeping a clump of boar hair in his wallet.

It is a popular subject among netsuke sculptors, and is mentioned in Kojiki (711-712), the oldest extant Japanese chronicle. The boar also features in Japanese poetry, having first appeared in the works of Yamabe no Akahito. Its importance in the Japanese diet was such that it was exempt from Emperor Tenmu's ban on meat-eating in 675.
