= Sumerian cuisine =

Historical cuisine of the people of Sumer

Sumerian cuisine encompasses the food eaten within Sumer, the earliest known civilization. The oldest known culinary recipes originates from a series of four Sumerian clay tablets in the Yale Babylonian Collection.

== Ingredients ==
=== Crops ===
Of the cereals, barley was the most important; emmer and rice were also present, though less common. Other field crops included date palms, flax, and sesame. Vegetables grown in gardens and orchards included cucumbers, leeks, garlic, onion, legumes (lentils, chickpeas, beans), and various kinds of herbs. Common fruit trees included pomegranates, figs, apples, quinces, and pears.

=== Animal products ===
Animals raised for meat and milk included sheep, cows, goats, and camels. Pigs were also raised for meat. Geese, ducks, pigeons, and chickens were raised for their meat and their eggs. Honey was collected from wild bees, and later through beekeeping.

== Alcohol ==
Beer made from barley was the most common alcoholic beverage.

== Yale culinary tablets ==
All surviving Sumerian recipes can be found on a series of four clay tablets in the Yale Babylonian Collection. Three of the tablets date to the Old Babylonian period, while the fourth dates to the Neo-Babylonian period, more than a thousand years later. The most complete of the tablets contains 25 recipes: 21 meat dishes, three vegetable and meat dishes, and one vegetarian dish.

=== Recipes ===
Known recipes include Elamite Broth (a rich soup composed of water, fat, dill, cilantro, leek, and garlic), Tuh’u (a boiled stew of diced lamb), and Unwinding (a soft soup that combines water, fat, kurrat, cilantro, salt, leek, garlic and crushed dry sourdough).

== See also ==
- Agriculture in Mesopotamia

== Bibliography ==
- Joannès, F. (2001). Dictionnaire de la civilisation mésopotamienne. Paris: R. Laffont. ISBN 2221092074.
- Potts, D. T. (1997). Mesopotamian Civilization: The Material Foundations. London: The Athlons Press. ISBN 0485930013.
- Postgate, J. N. (1992). Early Mesopotamia: Society and Economy at the Dawn of History (1st ed.). Taylor & Francis. doi:10.4324/9780203825662. ISBN 978-0-203-82566-2.
- Sasson, J. M. (1995). Civilizations of the Ancient Near East. New York: Scribner. ISBN 0684192799.
