= Origins of North Indian and Pakistani foods =

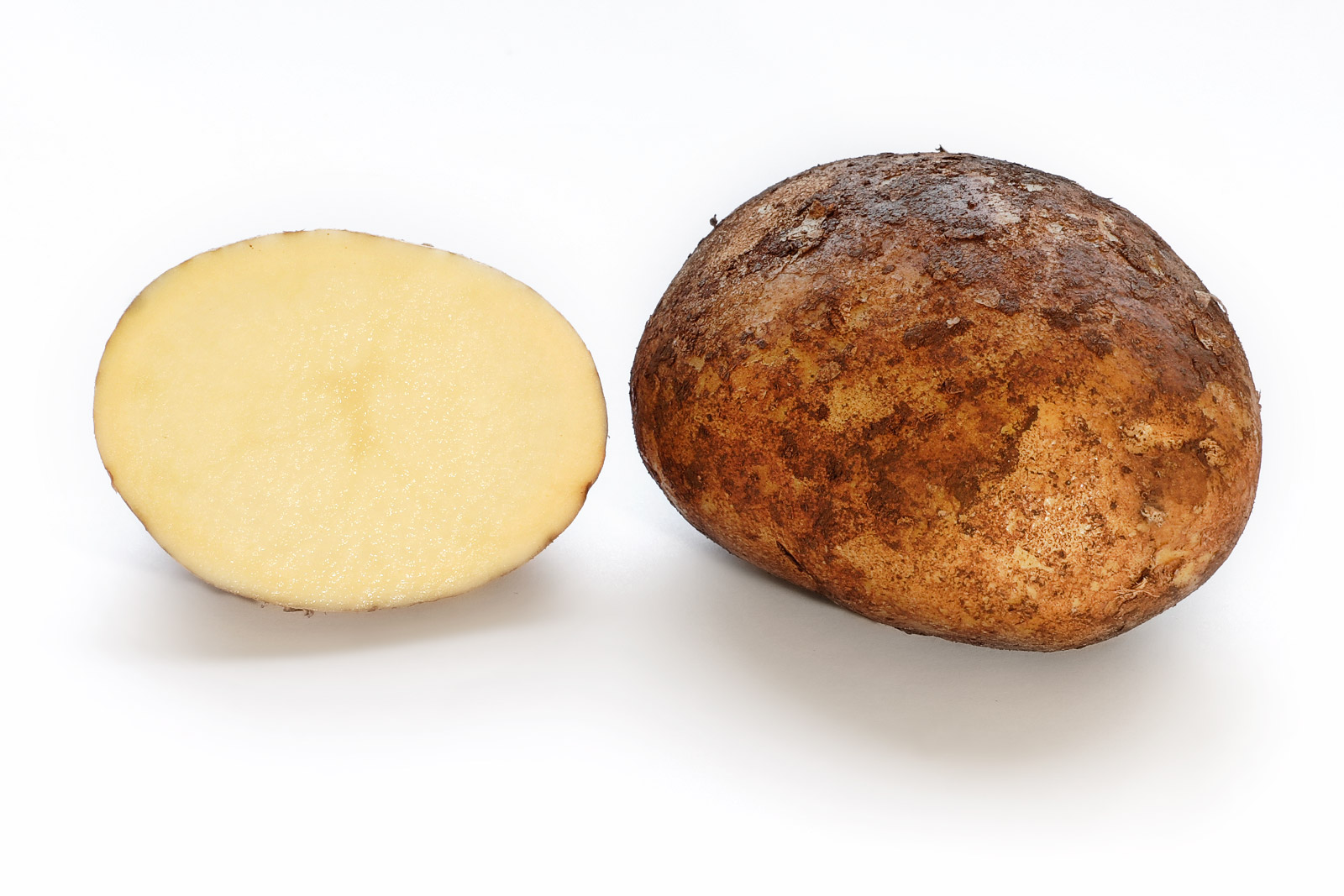
Potato (Aloo)

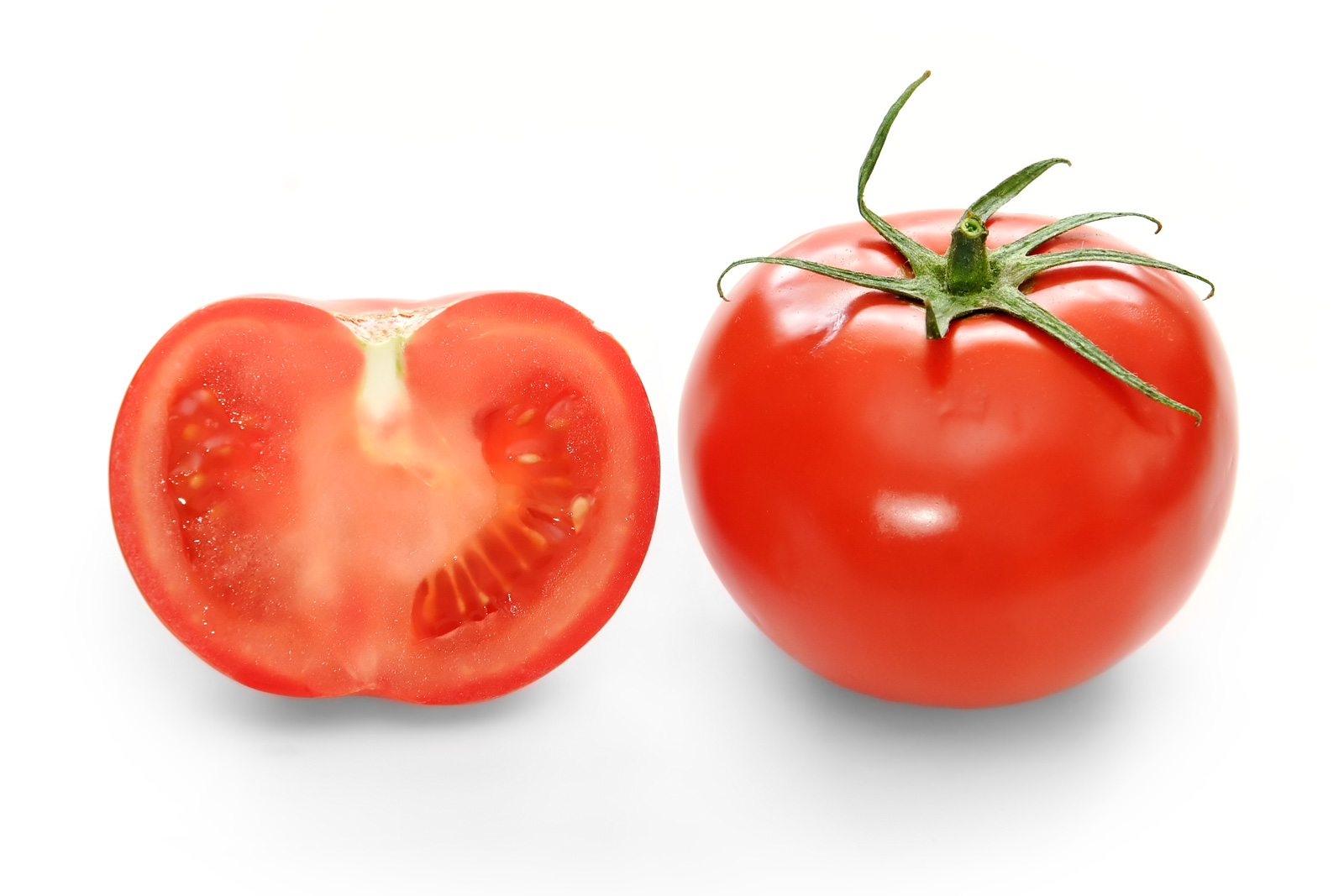
Tomato (Tamatar)

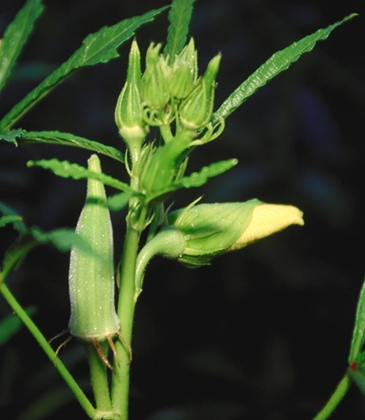
Okra (Bhindī)

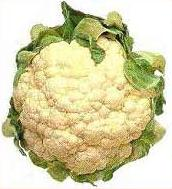
Cauliflower (Phool Gobhī)

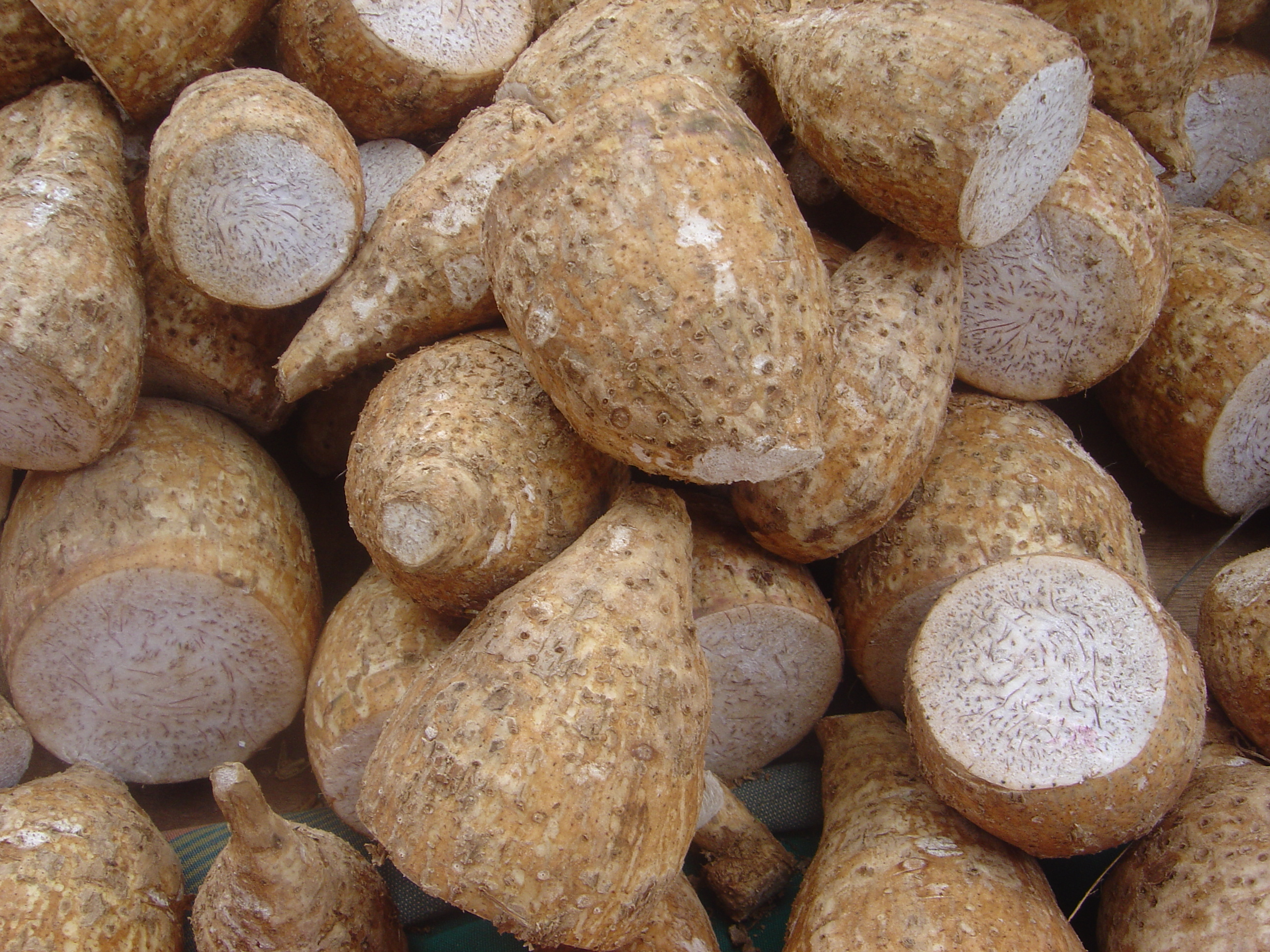
Taro (Arbī)

Most of the food items which define modern North Indian and Subcontinental cooking have origins inside the Indian subcontinent though many foods that are now a part of them are based on fruits and vegetables that originated outside the Indian subcontinent.

== Vegetable origins ==
Vegetable	Hindustānī name	Origin	Likely time of introduction	Notes
Bitter Melon	karela	Africa		
Cabbage	Patta Gobhī	Possibly European	During colonial times	Derived from Wild Mustard
Calabash	Laukī/Pankaj	China/Japan		
Cauliflower	Phool Gobhī	Cyprus	1822 CE	
Chili pepper	Mirch	Mesoamerica	1550 CE	india
Coriander	Dhaniya	North Africa or Mediterranean	1000 AD by Arabs	Mentioned in ancient Egypt
Brinjal	Baingan	India/China		
Fenugreek	Methī	Near East	326 BC	Alexander's campaign to India
Garlic	Lahsun	possibly Middle East	Unknown	
Lemon	Nīmbū	South China or Northeastern India	2000-1000 BC	Lemon seeds found in the Harappan Bara culture excavations indicate time of spread
Moringa		India		
Okra	Bhindī	Highlands of Ethiopia and india	100-500 CE	
Onion	Pyaaz	India	Unknown, but present by 500 BCE	Mentioned in the Charaka Samhita
Potato	Aloo (Alū)	South America (Peru/Bolivia)	1600 CE	Likely introduced by Portuguese traders
Sweet Potato	Shakarkand	South America	1600 CE)	Via Portugal
Taro	Arbī / Arwī/ Guhiyaan	India, Polynesia or SE Asia		
Tomato	Tamatar	Latin America (Mexico to Peru)	1600 CE	Likely introduced by Portuguese traders
Turnip	Shalgham	West Asia or Eastern Europe	1500 BC	Very early presence in the South Asia
Yam	Zimikand/Suran/kachalu/banda	Africa/Asia	7000 BCE	Different types of yams by taste, colour, size, skin, acidity

== Fruit origins ==
Fruit	Hindustānī Name	Origin	Likely time of introduction	Notes
Apple	Seb	Central Asia (Kazakhstan)	Unknown	
Mango	Aam	India	Unknown	Mango is mentioned by Hendrik van Rheede, the Dutch commander of the Malabar region in his 1678 book
Mulberry	Shehtoot/Toot	China/Japan	Unknown	Its white type is toxic whereas red is very sweet
Orange	Santara	India	Unknown	A sweeter Indian variety was introduced by the Portuguese in Europe (ca. 15th century)
Plum	Aloo Bokhara	Armenia	Unknown	
Tamarind	Imlī Hunase Hannū	Africa	Unknown	Known for savourish taste, the fruit has mention since Harappan times
Tangerine	Narangī	China	Unknown	

== See also ==
- Indian cuisine
- North Indian cuisine
