= History of Korean cuisine =

This article traces the history of cuisine of Korea.

== Three Kingdoms period (1st century B.C.–7th century A.D.) ==
The three major kingdoms, including Goguryeo, Baekje, and Silla, further diversified Korean food by spreading new ingredients and recipes to each other through intercultural exchanges.

Because each kingdom had its own geographical location, each kingdom had its own crops to grow and eat. However, they were able to share crops with one another thanks to their trade network.

== Goryeo (918–1392) ==
It was during the Goryeo Dynasty that the concept of Korean barbecue grilling meat at the table emerged. Bulgogi was also popular during this period.

== Joseon (1392–1897) ==
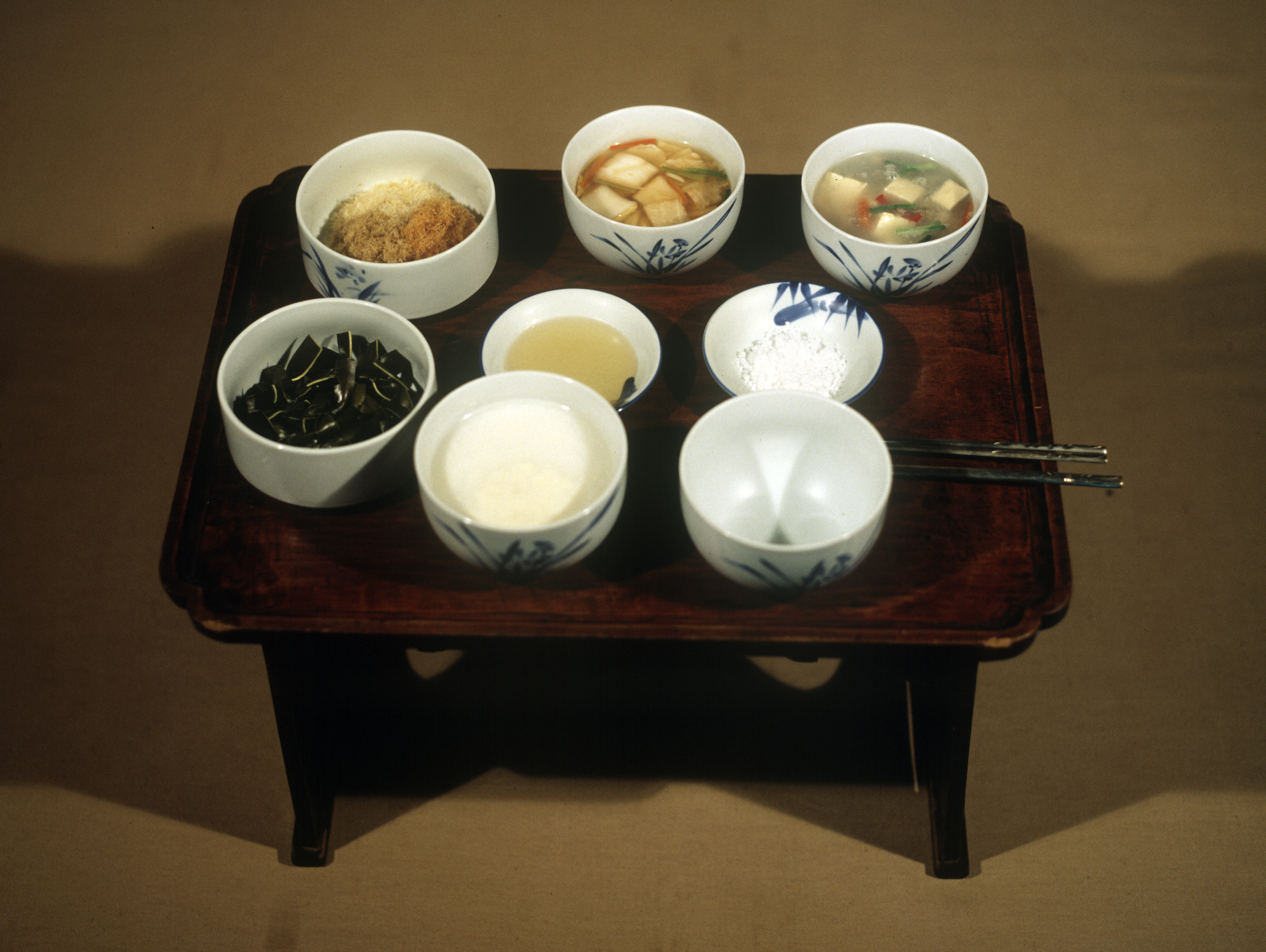
Korean royal court cuisine, Surasang

During the Joseon Dynasty, Confucianism had a strong influence in all aspects of life, and food was no exception. Confucian culture still influences Korean cuisine today.

The court food of the Joseon Dynasty was prepared by selected chefs with local specialties and fresh seasonal foods from all over the country. Court food has been handed down not only as a record of court feasts, but also as an oral tradition of court chefs and royal descendants from generation to generation. Records on court food in the Joseon Dynasty can be found in the "Wonhaeng Eulmyo Jeongri Uigwe" written in 1795.

Meals were typically held five times a day in the royal family. Porridge made with rice in the early morning, a royal breakfast around 10 a.m., a light meal in the afternoon, a royal dinner around 5 p.m., and a light meal at night were served. The royal table, called surasang, was served with several dishes, including rice and soup, as well as stews, hot pots, kimchi, and soy sauce.

== See also ==
- History of Korea
