= Mushimono =

Japanese steamed dish

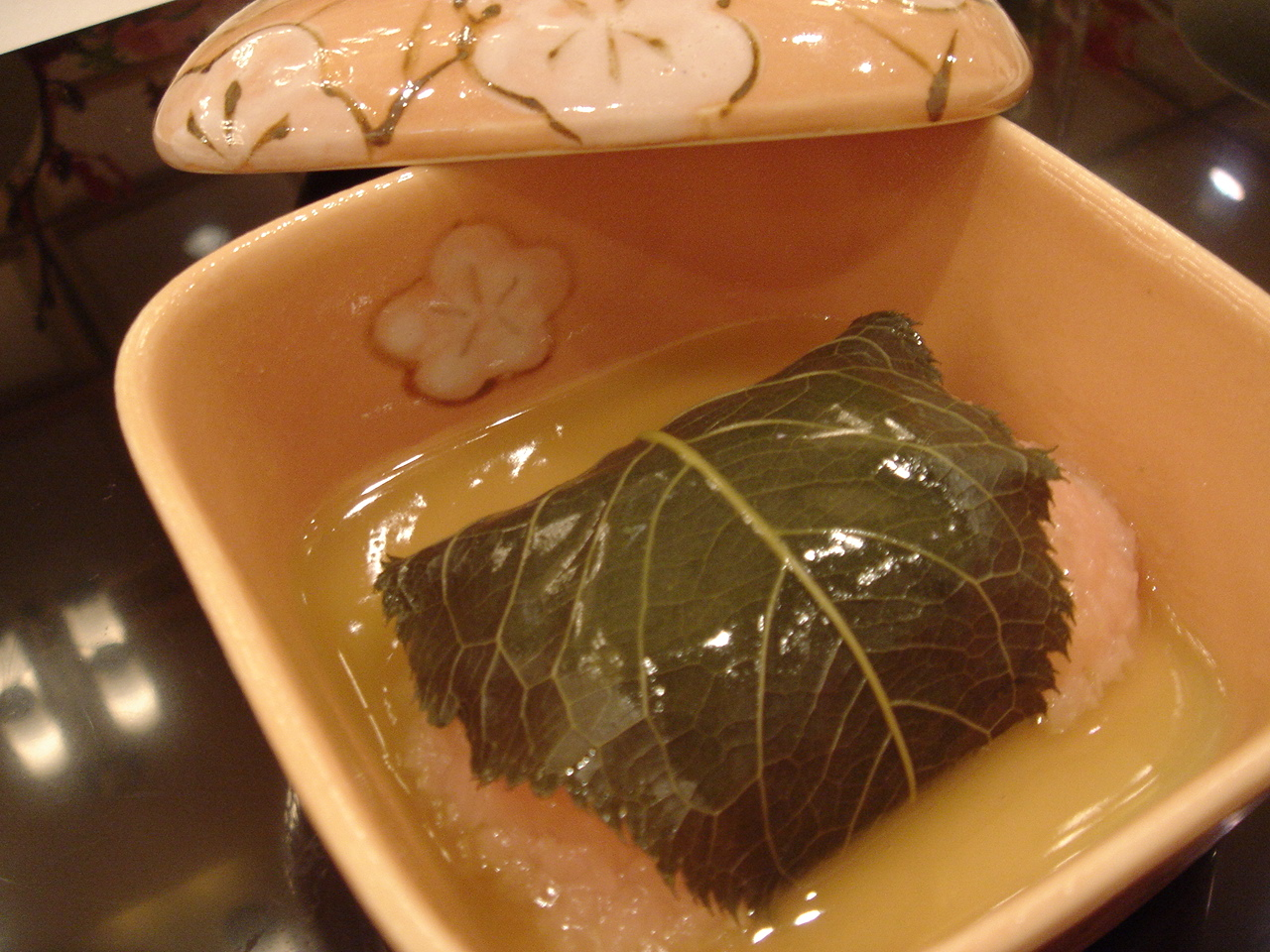
Mushimono with cherry leaf

Mushimono is a Japanese culinary term referring to a steamed dish, usually containing chicken, fish, or vegetables; sometimes treated with sake. The foods are steamed until soft and served hot. Chawanmushi is a popular example.

The steaming methods include:

- Steaming the ingredients in small bowls or cups. After steaming, the bowls are served on plates.
- Steaming the ingredients loose in a large steamer.
