= Terakado Seiken =

Japanese scholar (1796–1868)

- 寺門静軒
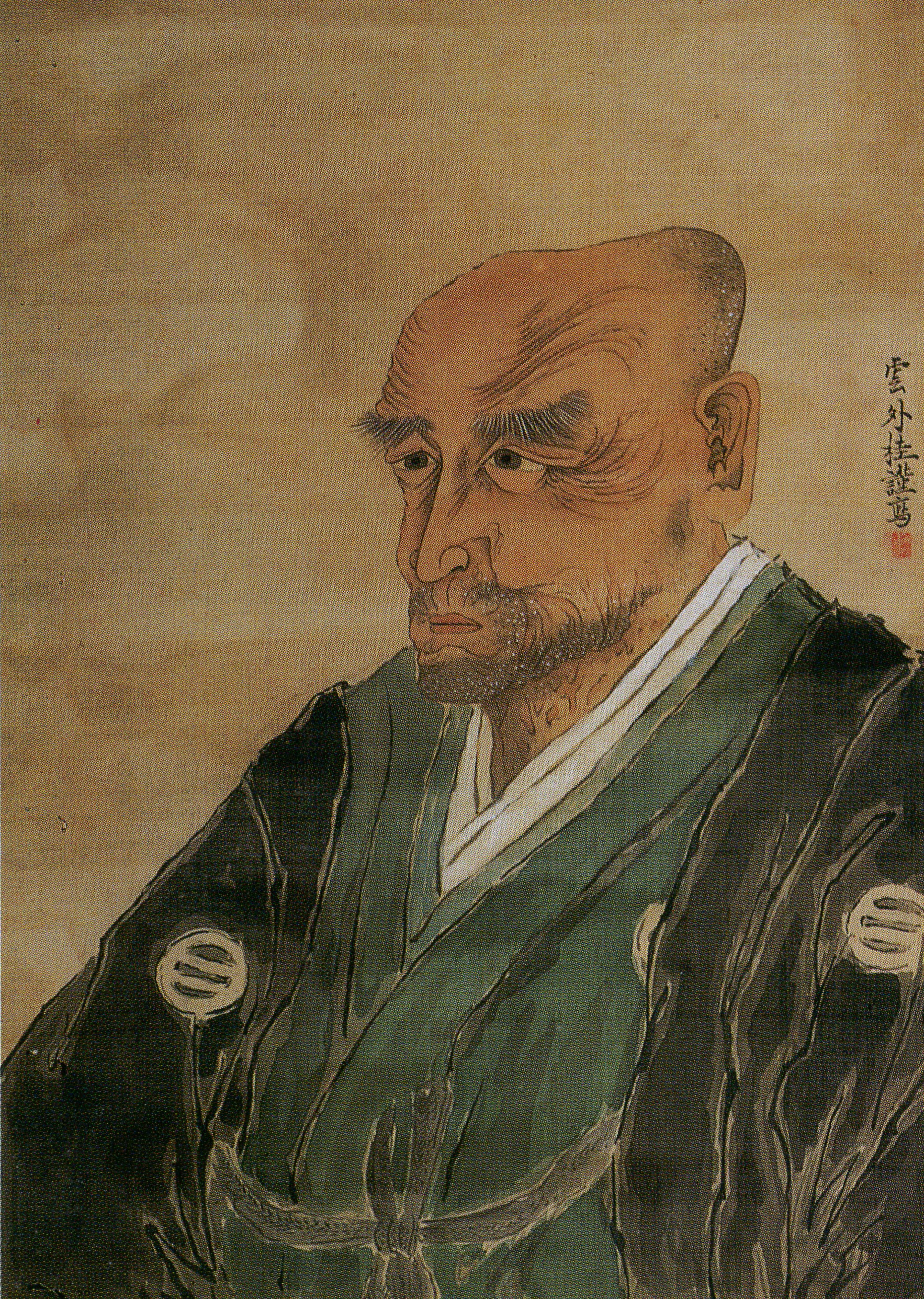
- Portrait of Terakado Seiken
- Born: 1796; Mito Domain
- Died: April 16, 1868

Terakado Seiken (寺門静軒) (1796 – April 16, 1868) was a Confucian scholar who lived in Japan during the Edo period. He is best known for writing about Tokyo.

== Early life ==
Terakado was born in Mito Domain in 1796. His father, a minor government official, died when Terakado was 13 years old. After his father's death he lived a delinquent lifestyle before turning to Confucianism and eventually opening a school. Like his father, he held a minor position as a samurai.

== Career ==
In 1831 he wrote a series of essays titled "An Account of the Prosperity of Edo" (江戸繁昌記, Edo Hanjoki). The essays were compiled as a book and published in 1838. The essays were banned by Edo officials in 1835, and after publication the woodblocks the book was printed with were confiscated in 1842. At the same time Terakado was also banned from being an official. After losing his position as a samurai Terakado wandered Japan and worked as a schoolteacher and writer. He died on April 16, 1868.

Edo Hanjoki was a scathing social satire of the Tokugawa government. He wrote most of the essays in literary kanbun, which is typically only used in government documents. This brought an additional level of seriousness to the subjects that he wrote about, bringing accounts of fights between common people to the level of epic battles. When writing about wealthier districts like Honjo, he focused on the more unsavory parts of the neighborhood, such as brothels. He also frequently juxtaposed the upper and lower classes to shed more light on the economic inequalities within the Tokugawa government's system. The Edo Hanjoki influenced later generations of social critics and writers.

Terakado's work was written about extensively by the scholar Andrew L. Markus.
