= Wakefield (surname) =

Origin
- Meaning: "Watch field", or "Waca's field"; one who came from Wakefield in the West Riding of Yorkshire
- Region of origin: Yorkshire

Wakefield is an English surname. Wakefield is the 1,356th most common surname in Great Britain, with 7,767 bearers. It is most common in the West Midlands, where it is the 257th most common surname, with 3,260 bearers. Other concentrations include, the City of Leeds, (237th,1,668), Devon, (457th,1,684), and Kent, (810th,1,614). Notable people with the surname include:

- Andrew Wakefield (born 1956), British former bowel surgeon known for fraudulent research
- Angela Wakefield (born 1978), British artist
- Captain Arthur Wakefield (1799–1843), New Zealand coloniser, who died in the Wairau Affray in New Zealand
- Bernard Wakefield (c. 1883–1967), British-American businessman, co-founder of Cushman & Wakefield
- Charity Wakefield (born 1980), British actress
- Charles Wakefield (disambiguation)
  - Charles Wakefield, 1st Viscount Wakefield of Hythe (1859–1941), British peer and founder of Castrol
  - Charles Wakefield (numismatist) (1834–1919), British numismatist and museum curator
- Dan Wakefield (1932–2024), American novelist, journalist, and screenwriter
- Daniel Wakefield (1776–1846), English writer on political economy
- Daniel Bell Wakefield (1798–1858), English judge, son of Edward Wakefield
- Edward Wakefield (disambiguation)
  - Edward Wakefield (1774–1854), English philanthropist and statistician
  - Edward Wakefield (New Zealand politician) (1845–1924), son of Felix Wakefield, New Zealand politician and journalist
  - Edward Gibbon Wakefield (1796–1862), English theorist on colonisation
  - Edward Wakefield (British politician) (1903–1969), British civil servant and Conservative Member of Parliament
- Elsie Maud Wakefield (1886–1972), English mycologist
- Emma Wakefield-Paillet (1868–1946), American physician
- Felix Wakefield (1807–1875), brother of Edward Gibbon Wakefield
- Floyd L. Wakefield (1919–2007), American politician
- George William Wakefield (1887–1942), British comics author
- Gilbert Wakefield (1756–1801), English scholar and controversialist
- Howard Wakefield (1884–1941), American baseball player
- Hugh Wakefield (1888–1971), English actor
- Humphry Wakefield (born 1936), English baronet
- James Wakefield (1825–1910), United States politician
- Jenn Wakefield (born 1989), Canadian ice hockey player
- Jerningham Wakefield (1820–1879), New Zealand politician and author of Adventures in New Zealand, son of Edward Gibbon Wakefield
- John Wakefield (disambiguation)
  - John Allen Wakefield (1797–1873), United States politician and military leader
  - John Peter Wakefield (1915–1942), British racing car driver
- Julie Wakefield, American actress, known for The Shopping Bag Lady
- Mary Augusta Wakefield (1853–1910), British author, composer, and singer
- Melanie Wakefield, Australian psychologist and behavioural researcher
- Norman Arthur Wakefield (1918–1972), Australian naturalist
- Priscilla Wakefield (1751–1832), English author
- Rhys Wakefield, (born 1988), Australian actor
- Richard Wakefield (born 1952), American poet and literary critic
- Robert Wakefield (died 1537), English linguist and scholar
- H. Russell Wakefield, (1888–1964), English author
- Peter Wakefield (disambiguation)
- S. A. Wakefield (1927–2009), Australian author
- Samuel Wakefield (?–1883), American postmaster, and state legislator in Louisiana
- Samuel Wakefield (1799–1895), American Methodist pastor, teacher, music editor and composer
- Susan Wakefield (1942–2022), taxation expert from New Zealand
- Tim Wakefield (1966–2023), American baseball player
- Vikki Wakefield (born 1970), Australian young adult fiction writer
- Wavell Wakefield, 1st Baron Wakefield of Kendal (1898–1983), British politician
- Willa Holt Wakefield (1870–1946), American vaudeville performer
- Colonel William Wakefield (1801–1848), who founded Wellington, New Zealand, brother of Edward Gibbon Wakefield

== In fiction ==
- Elizabeth Wakefield and Jessica Wakefield, twins from the Sweet Valley High series of young adult novels
