= Worcester Repertory Company =

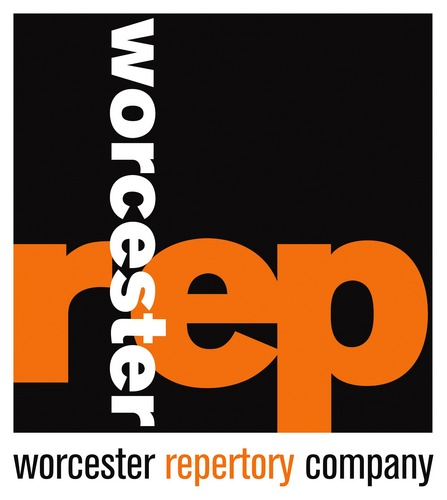
- Industry: Theatre
- Founded: 1967
- Founder: John Hole | David Wood | Sam Walters
- Key people: Chairman: Lord Faulkner of Worcester Acting Artistic Director: Ben Humphrey Chief Executive: Sarah-Jane Morgan
- Website: www.worcester-rep.co.uk

The Worcester Repertory Company (WRC) is a regional theatre company based in Worcester, UK. The company was founded in 1967 by John Hole, David Wood and Sam Walters.

The company's home is the Swan Theatre in Worcester, and the Artistic Director of the WRC also serves as the de facto Director of the theatre.

== Overview ==
The Worcester Repertory Company was founded in 1967 after John Hole was appointed the Director of the Swan Theatre. Early productions were limited to an eight week season and included classic works, modern plays and new works; most notably premieres from writer, director and actor, David Wood. The company's first season also included a West End transfer of a new musical, A Present from the Corporation, starring Terence Brady & Julia McKenzie

The company's first production was Ann Jellicoe's The Knack directed by David Wood. On the opening night an audience member walked out of the theatre and berated the cast for the use of bad language and the 'controversial' nature of the subject material.

The WRC produced over one hundred plays under the directorship of founding Artistic Director John Hole, and productions from the company continued to grow throughout the 1970s, 1980s and 1990s under subsequent Artistic Directors. During this time a considerable number of recognisable actors, writers and directors worked with the company, and it became renowned as a breeding ground for new UK talent to emerge onto the theatrical scene.

== Artistic Directors ==
The company to-date has had nine Artistic Directors, the longest serving of which is its current Artistic Director, Chris Jaeger MBE.

=== John Hole (1967 - 1974) ===
John Hole, along with David Wood and Sam Walters founded the Worcester Repertory Company as the resident professional company at the Swan Theatre, Worcester. The theatre had opened two years previously, in 1965, but struggled to cope with the administration and day-to-day running. John Hole was appointed as the theatre's director and he later convinced the board of trustees to form a professional company that would run for eight weeks of the year to dovetail with the amateur programme. The Arts Council granted the company £450 to underwrite any loss that the company might make. As well as main-stage productions at the Swan Theatre, the WRC produced touring theatre to schools as well as other venues including The Abbey Theatre, St. Albans, Plymouth Athenaeum and the New Theatre Cardiff. Directors during this era included Sam Walters, David Wood, Mick Hughes, Don Dryden and John Hope-Mason. David Wood, who would later be referred to as the "national children's dramatist", wrote his first children's play The Tinder Box for the WRC in 1967 and premiered many of his most successful plays at the Swan Theatre during John Hole's tenure.

=== Michael Winter (1974 - 1977) ===
Michael Winter had previously been a Staff Producer at the Saddlers Wells Opera and the Director of Productions for Bournemouth Theatre Company before he was appointed as the Worcester Repertory Company's Artistic Director. Productions during his tenure continued the eclectic programme set up by John Hole and included A Midsummer Night's Dream, The Lion in Winter, The Philanthropist, The Mating Game, Boeing Boeing, Sleuth, Absurd Person Singular, Oh Coward, Funny Peculiar and Mrs. Warren's Profession. Associate directors during Michael Winter's tenure included, Don Dryden and Richard Digby Day.

=== Patrick Masefield OBE (1977 - 1982) ===
Patrick Masefield had worked as a freelance theatre director and Arts Council Officer before he was appointed as the Artistic Director of the Worcester Repertory Company. He had also founded the Stagecoach Young People's Theatre in 1969, which toured nationally and was the subject of a Tyne Tees Television Documentary. Masefield's productions were much bigger that the previous two directors', favouring musicals and big casts. In 1984-85 he wrote and directed a play about Woodbine Willie that featured a cast of over 200 people. Other large scale productions included Treasure Island, Joseph and the Amazing Technicolour Dreamcoat, The Royal Hunt of the Sun, Animal Farm Dr. Faustus and Godspell (starring Bonnie Langford). Masefield also developed the theatre's youth theatre provision, and many young actors made their professional debuts with the Worcester Repertory Company. Masefield also appointed John Doyle as the company's Associate Director, who would become the theatre's Artistic Director after Masefield's departure.

=== John Doyle (1982 - 1985) ===
John Doyle had made his directorial debut with the Worcester Repertory Company as its Associate Director under Patrick Masefield with Sailor Beware. Prior to his arrival as Associate Director he had worked at the Eden Court Theatre, Inverness as a performer. His first production as Artistic Director was Cabaret which also marked the professional debut of Rufus Norris as a member of the supporting cast. Other productions include Gypsy, A Tale of Two Cities, Vesta, The Elephant Man, The Dresser, Abigail's Party and You're A Good Man Charlie Brown. Doyle also developed the use of the Swan Theatre's Studio space along with one of his Associate Directors, Phyllida Lloyd CBE.

=== John Ginman (1985 - 1988) ===
Following John Doyle's tenure as Artistic Director of the WRC many of the company's designers and production team followed him to the Everyman Theatre in Cheltenham, leaving John Ginman with a number of positions to fill. Ginman's tenure focused more on classical works including The Mystery Plays, The Importance of Being Earnest, The Servant to Two Masters and The Tempest. Associate Directors during this time included Chris White.

=== Pat Trueman (1988 - 1994) ===
Pat Trueman arrived as the Artistic Director of the Worcester Repertory Company from the Oldham Coliseum. She had also directed extensively for BBC Drama and the BBC World Service. During her tenure as Artistic Director, the Swan Theatre was nominated for the TMA Most Welcoming Theatre in England and Wales Award as well as for an Award for Best Show for Young People. Productions staged during this time included Othello, The Glass Menagerie, The Recruiting Officer, Our Country's Good, A Midsummer Night's Dream, Far From the Madding Crowd and The Lusty Comedy of Tom Jones. Pat Trueman appointed two Associate Directors during her time: Paul Clarkson, who had previously been a member of the acting company; and Jenny Stephens, who would later take over as the next Artistic Director.

=== Jenny Stephens (1994 - 2002) ===
Jenny Stephens had worked as a freelance director and Associate of the company before taking up the post of Artistic Director. She had also won the BP Young Director's Award. Productions during her time as Artistic Director included The Wizard of Oz, Steaming, The Malvern Widow, The Importance of Being Earnest, Talking Heads, When I Was A Girl, Who's Afraid of Virginia Woolf?, Henceforward, The Seagull and Private Lives. Stephens' time with the WRC significantly incorporated community work, resulting in productions that utilised members of the youth theatre, amateur companies and professional company in new work written by members of the writer's network at the Swan Theatre. There were a number of Associate Directors during this time, most notably Mark Babych, Dawn Allsop & Paul Milton.

=== Chris Jaeger MBE (2003 - 2019) ===
Towards the end of Stephens' tenure, the company lost both Arts Council and Worcester City Council funding, and both the WRC and the Swan Theatre were closed for a period of six months. The theatre reopened in early 2003 with Chris Jaeger as the new Artistic Director. Production was very limited for the first few years, with a maximum of two in-house productions staged per year. In 2008 - 2011 production began to develop, and other venues around the city of Worcester were utilised as well as the Swan Theatre. Productions are now staged in venues across the city including The Commandery, Worcester Cathedral and The Swan Theatre. Jaeger's tenure also saw a national touring programme of one-man shows as well as international transfers to the National Theatre, Craiova. Productions have included A Midsummer Night's Dream, Othello, The Importance of Being Earnest, As You Like It, The Comedy of Errors, Where is Mrs. Christie?, Jesus My Boy, Cider With Rosie, The Second Best Bed, King John, Macbeth and Romeo and Juliet. From 2012 the Associate Director was Ben Humphrey. A young company, The Young Rep, was founded in 2017 to give more opportunities to young people from all backgrounds to be able to take part in theatrical performances. Chris Jaeger stepped down from the company "by mutual agreement" in 2019.

=== Ben Humphrey (2019 - 2020) ===
Ben Humphrey left his post as Associate Director in mid 2018 to take up a position in Scotland, however, he returned to the company a year later to take up the role of Acting Artistic Director.

== Notable Members ==
- David Ashton
- Mark Babych
- Tracy Brabin
- Terence Brady
- Jean Boht
- Phyllis Calvert
- Paul Clarkson
- Hilary Crane
- Richard Digby Day
- John Doyle
- Gerald Flood
- Vincent Franklin
- William Gaminara
- Simon Grover
- Sarah Hadland
- David Harewood MBE
- Daniel Hill
- Celia Imrie MBE
- Michael Keating
- Bonnie Langford
- Iain Lauchlan
- Ian Lavender
- Rula Lenska
- Phylida Lloyd CBE
- Deborah McAndrew
- Alistair McGowan
- Julia McKenzie
- Rufus Norris (Current Patron of the Young Rep)
- Sean Pertwee
- Emma Rice
- Lucy Robinson
- Auriol Smith
- Imelda Staunton CBE (Current Patron)
- Alison Steadman
- Katy Stephens
- Chris Tranchell
- Sam Walters
- Richard Wilson
- Mark Wynter
- David Wood
