= King John (play) =

Play by Shakespeare

The Life and Death of King John (also King John), by William Shakespeare, is a history play about the reign of John, King of England (r. 1199–1216), the son of Henry II and Eleanor of Aquitaine, and the father of Henry III. King John was written in the mid-1590s but published in 1623 in the First Folio of Shakespeare's works.

== Characters ==
- King John – King of England
- Eleanor (Note: Appears variously in the Folio of 1623 as Elinor, Eleanor, Ele., Elea., and Eli. Contemporary editors unanimously prefer the form Eleanor.) – the Queen mother, widow of King Henry II
- Prince Henry – his son, later King Henry III
- Blanche of Castile – John's niece
- Earl of Essex – an English nobleman
- Earl of Salisbury – an English nobleman
- Earl of Pembroke – an English nobleman
- Lord Bigod – Earl of Norfolk
- Peter of Pomfret – a prophet
- Philip Faulconbridge – also known as Philip the Bastard and Sir Richard the Plantagenet; natural son of Richard I of England
- Robert Faulconbridge – his half brother; legitimate son of Sir Robert Faulconbridge
- Lady Faulconbridge – their mother; widow of Sir Robert Faulconbridge
- James Gurney – her attendant
- Lady Constance – widow of Geoffrey II of Brittany, John's sister-in-law
- Prince Arthur – her son, King John's nephew, claimant to the English throne and eventual Duke of Brittany (Note: The First Folio uses the spelling "Britaine", which it also uses in Cymbeline where it means "Britain".)
- Sheriff
- Two Executioners
- English Herald
- English Messenger
- King Philip II – King of France
- Louis the Dauphin (Note: The First Folio normally refers to him as the "Dolphin", which is a literal translation of the French title "Dauphin".) – Philip’s son
- Viscount of Melun
- Châtillon – French ambassador to England
- Hubert (Note: Braunmuller, following Wilson, rejects his identification with Hubert de Burgh on the basis of the exchange at 4.3.87–89. 'BIGOT: Out, dunghill! Dar'st thou brave a nobleman?' 'HUBERT: Not for my life; but yet I dare defend / My innocent life against an emperor'.) – citizen of Angiers and later a follower of King John
- Citizen of Angiers
- French Herald
- French Messenger
- Limoges, Duke of Austria (composite of Aimar V of Limoges and Leopold V, Duke of Austria)
- Cardinal Pandolf – legate from Pope Innocent III
- Lords, soldiers, attendants etc.
Family tree of characters in King John

PLANTAGENET	CAPET
Henry II; K.England 1154–89	Eleanor of Aquitaine	Louis VII; K.France 1137–80
Richard I K.England 1189–99	Geoffrey	Lady Constance	KING JOHN; K.England 1199–1216	Eleanor; Queen of Castile	Philip II; K.France 1180–1223
Philip; Faulconbridge (‘The Bastard’)	Arthur	Henry III (‘Prince Henry’); K.England 1216–72	Blanche of Castile	Louis VIII (‘The Dauphin’); K.France 1223–26

== Synopsis ==
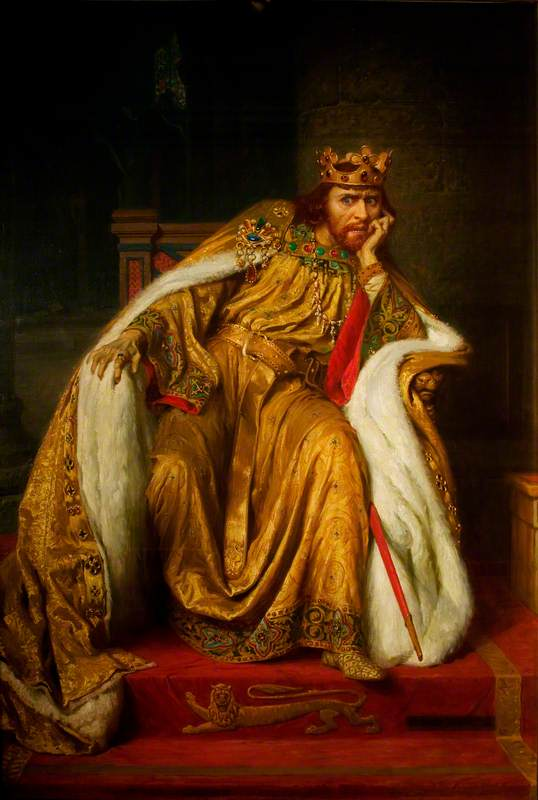
The Life and Death of King John (1590): The stage actor Herbert Beerbohm Tree (1852–1917) as the eponymous monarch. (Charles A. Buchel, 1900)

King John receives an ambassador from France who demands with a threat of war that he renounce his throne in favour of his nephew, Arthur, whom the French King Philip believes to be the rightful heir to the throne under primogeniture.

John adjudicates an inheritance dispute between Robert Faulconbridge and his older brother Philip, whom Robert accuses of illegitimacy. Queen Eleanor of Aquitaine, the mother to King John, notes that Philip looks very similar to her late son King Richard the Lionheart. Queen Eleanor accordingly suggests that Philip renounce his claim to the Faulconbridge estates in exchange for a non-inheriting position within the House of Plantagenet and a knighthood. After mocking Robert Faulconbridge's ugliness at length, Philip enthusiastically agrees and Queen Eleanor praises Philip as possessing "the very spirit of Plantagenet". King John knights Philip as Sir Richard the Plantagenet. Afterwards, learning Philip has renounced his inheritance, Lady Faulconbridge reluctantly confirms Queen Eleanor's suspicions about her son's secret parentage to him.

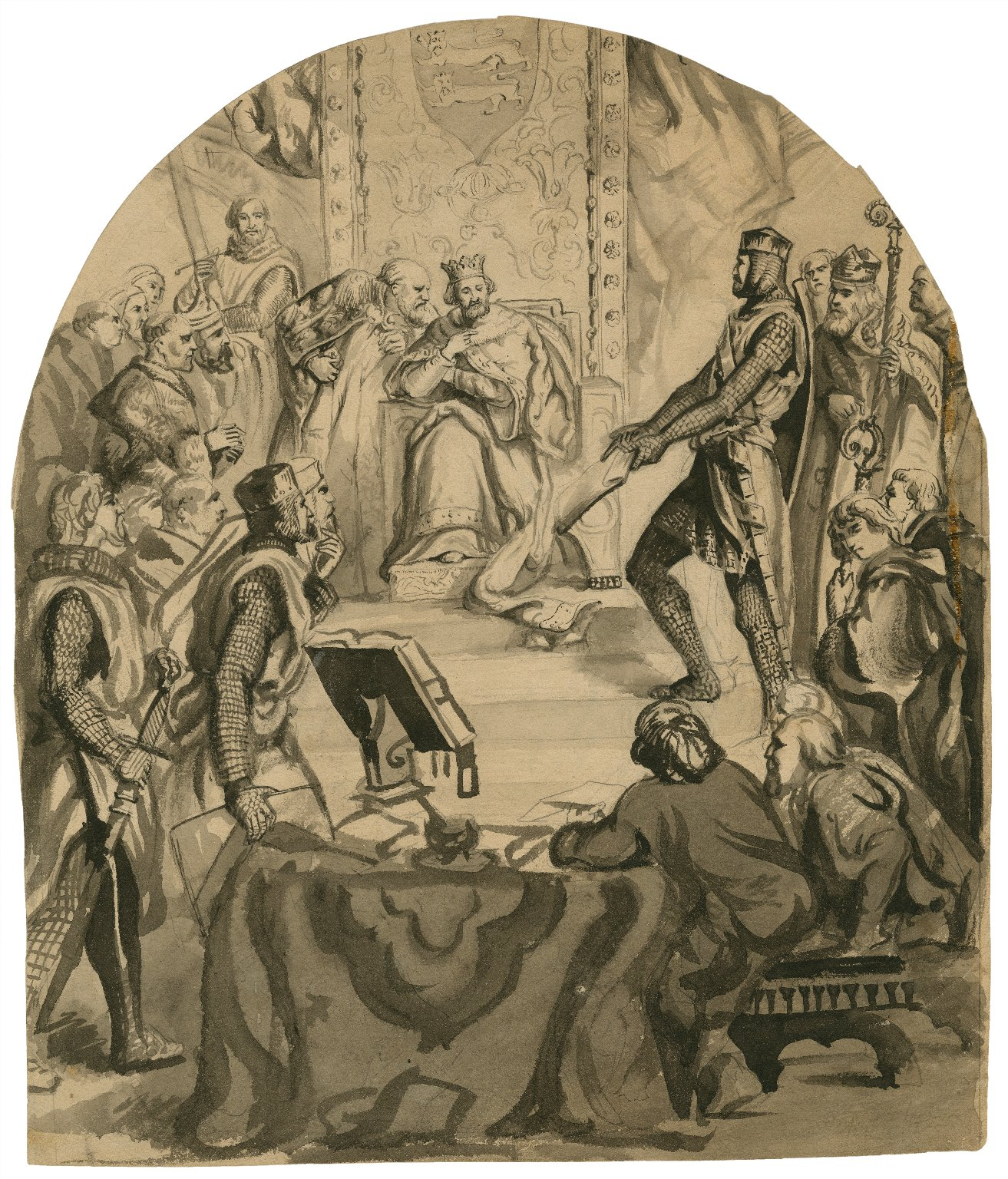
A 19th century drawing by Thomas Nast

As part of his efforts to back regime change in the Angevin Empire, King Philip and his forces besiege the Angevin walled city of Angers, threatening to put them to the sack unless the citizens accept Prince Arthur as their King. Philip is supported by the Duke of Austria, who is alleged to have killed Richard the Lionheart. The English Army arrives. Queen Eleanor then trades insults with Constance, Arthur's mother. Kings Philip and John argue their claims in front of Angers's citizens, but to no avail: their representative says that they will support the rightful king, whoever that turns out to be upon the battlefield.

The French and English armies clash, but no clear victor emerges. Each army dispatches a herald claiming victory, but Angers's citizens continue to refuse to recognize either claimant because neither army has proven victorious.

Philip the Bastard proposes that the armies of England and France unite against Angers. The citizens suggest an alternative proposal: that Philip's son, Louis the Lion, marry John's niece Blanche of Castile. The proposal would give John a stronger claim to the throne while Louis would gain territory for France. Though a furious Constance denounces King Philip for abandoning the claims of Prince Arthur, Louis and Blanche are married offstage.

Cardinal Pandolf arrives from Pope Innocent III bearing a formal accusation. As the latest salvo of the Investiture Controversy, King John is blocking the Pope's chosen Archbishop, Stephen Langton, from the Diocese of Canterbury and has further imposed Caesaropapism upon the Catholic Church in England. John defies the Holy See and vows that "No Italian priest shall tithe or toll in our dominions", whereupon the Cardinal declares him excommunicated and invokes the Papal deposing power to remove him as King. Pandolf demands that the French king renounce the new treaty, though Philip is hesitant, having just established familial ties to King John. Cardinal Pandolf points out that Philip's links to the Vatican are older and firmer.

Battle breaks out; the Duke of Austria is slain and beheaded by the Bastard in revenge for his father's death; and both Angers and Prince Arthur are captured by John's army. Queen Eleanor is left in charge of the Angevin Empire in France, while the Bastard is sent to extort funds from English monasteries. John secretly orders Hubert to kill Arthur. Pandolf informs Louis that he now has as strong a claim to the English throne as Arthur or John, and Louis agrees to invade England.

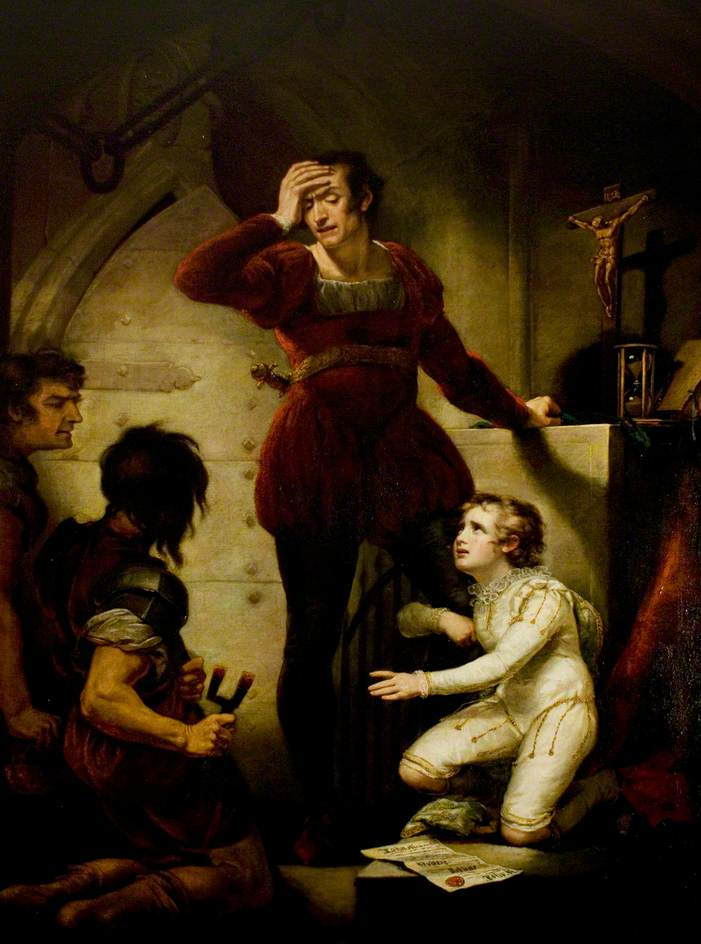
"King John", Act IV, Scene 1, Hubert and Arthur (from the Boydell series), James Northcote (1789)

Hubert is reluctant to blind and kill Prince Arthur and spares him in secret. The English nobility demand Arthur's release. John agrees, but Hubert then tells him that Arthur is dead. The nobles, believing the Prince was murdered by his own uncle, defect to Louis's side. Equally upsetting, and more heartbreaking to John, is the news of his mother's death, along with that of Lady Constance. The Bastard reports that the monasteries are unhappy about John's attempt to steal their lands and gold. Hubert has a furious argument with John, during which he reveals that Arthur is still alive. John, delighted, sends him to report the news to the nobles.

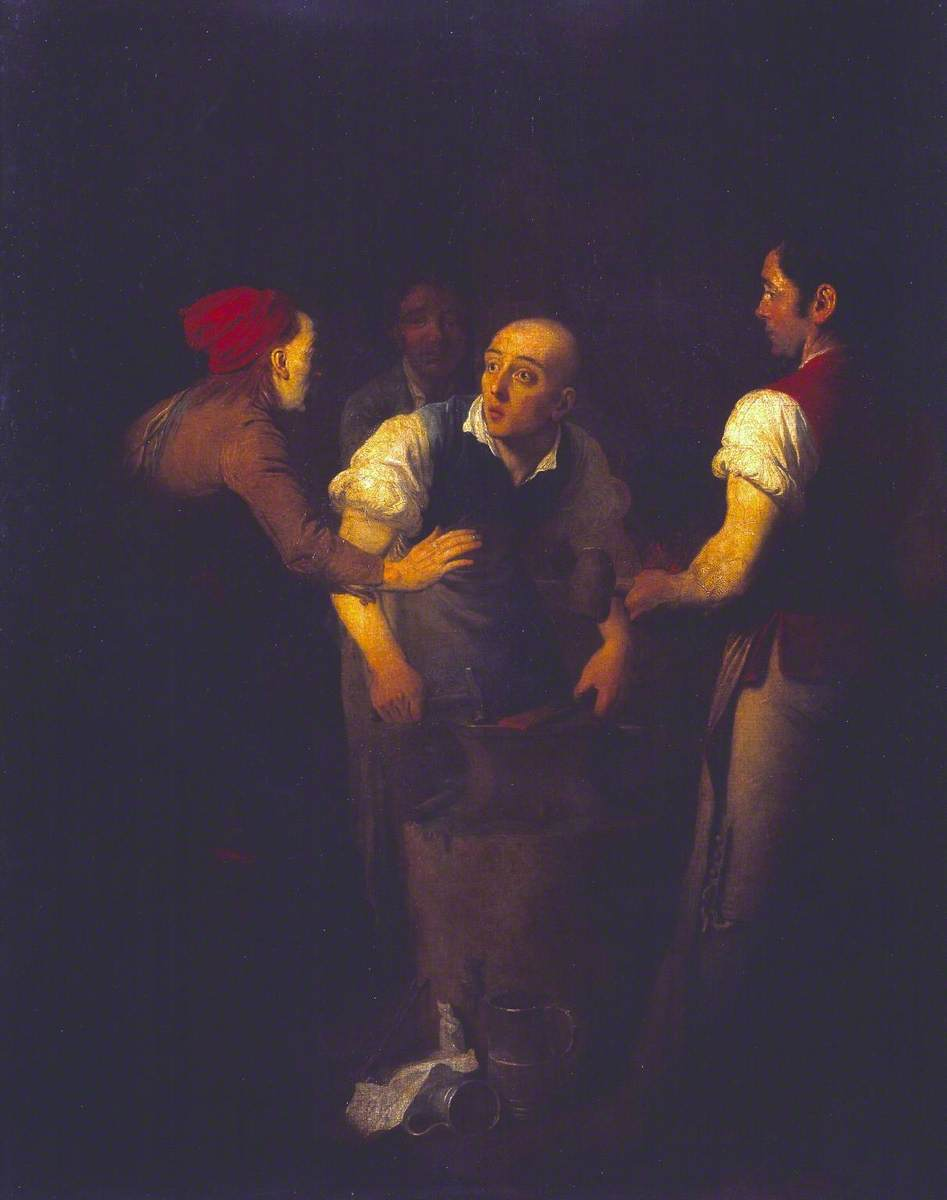
The Gossiping Blacksmith, Edward Penny (1769)

Arthur dies after jumping from a castle wall during an escape attempt. The nobles find his body, believe he was murdered by John, and refuse to believe Hubert's entreaties. A defeated John surrenders his crown to Pandolf, who reverses John's excommunication and gives the crown back in return for the restored independence of the English Church from control by the State. John orders the Bastard, one of his few remaining loyal subjects, to lead the English army against the invading forces from France.

While the English nobility swears allegiance to Louis, Pandolf arrives and explains that John has renounced his claims of supreme authority over the English Church, but Prince Louis vows to continue his invasion anyway and seize the Crown of England for himself. Pandolf excommunicates the Prince and the Bastard arrives with an English army and also threatens Louis, but to no avail. The First Barons' War breaks out with substantial losses on each side, including Louis's reinforcements, who are shipwrecked and drowned during the sea crossing. Many English nobles return to John's side after a dying French nobleman, Melun, warns them that Louis plans to kill them in a political purge after his victory.

John is poisoned offstage by a monk, whose loyalties and motivations are left unexplained. His nobles gather around him as he dies. The Bastard plans a second assault on Louis's forces, until he learns that Cardinal Pandolf has ended the invasion by forcing Louis to sign the Treaty of Lambeth. Starting with his cousin, Philip the Bastard, the English nobility all swear allegiance to John's son Prince Henry, who decrees that his father shall be buried in Worcester, as he himself had wished. Before the curtain falls, Philip the Bastard reflects:

"O, let us pay the time but needful woe,
Since it hath been beforehand with our griefs.
This England never did and never shall,
Lie at the proud foot of a conqueror,
But when it first did help to wound itself.
Now these her princes are come home again,
Come the three corners of the world in arms,
And we shall shock them. Nought shall make us rue,
If England to itself do rest but true."

== Sources ==
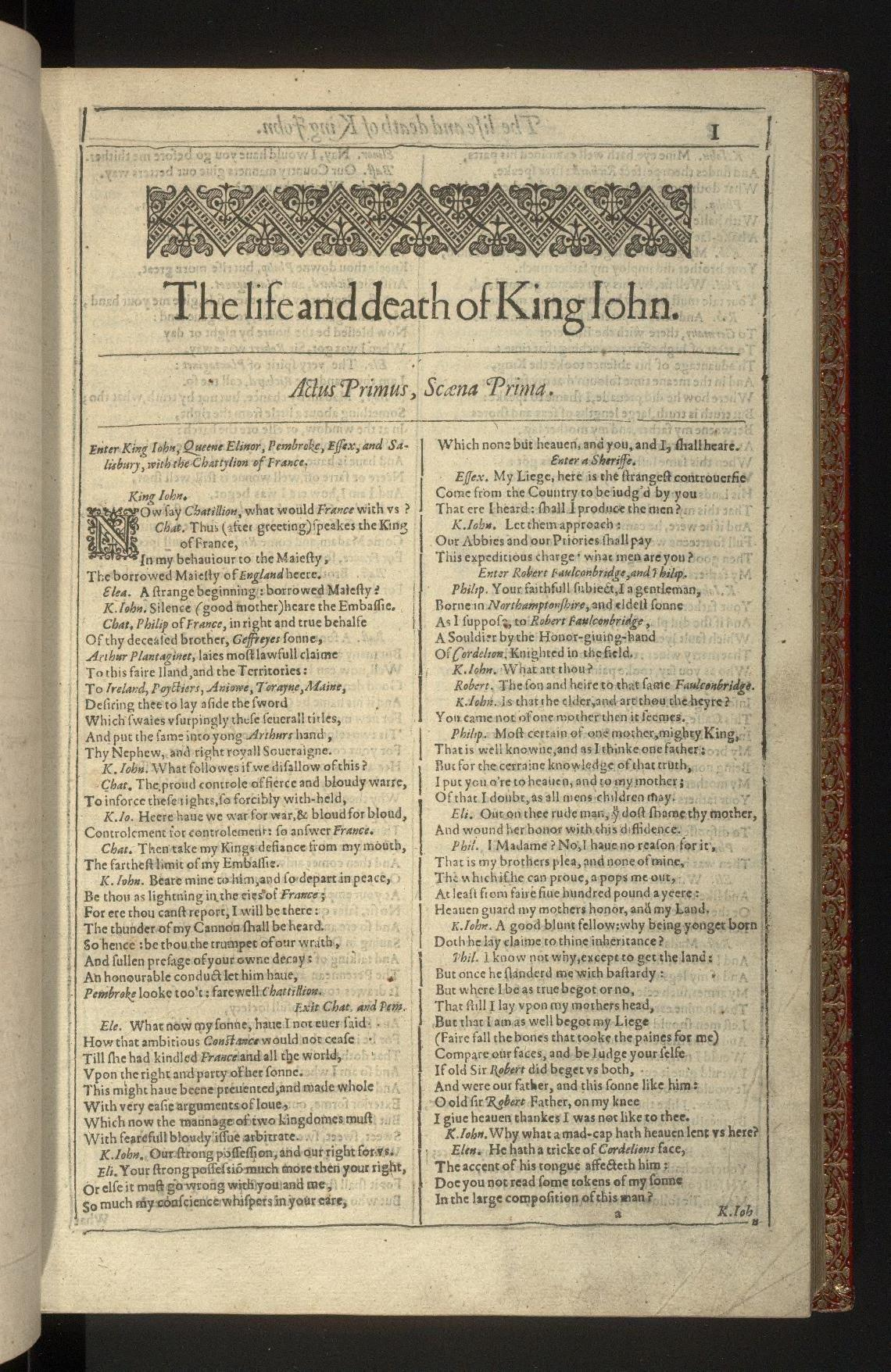
The first page of King John from the First Folio of Shakespeare's plays, published in 1623

King John is closely related to an anonymous history play, The Troublesome Reign of King John (c. 1589), the "masterly construction" the infelicitous expression of which led Peter Alexander to argue that Shakespeare's was the earlier play. (Note: Alexander (1929), cited in Honigmann (1983) and in Alexander (1961).) E. A. J. Honigmann elaborated these arguments, both in his preface to the second Arden edition of King John, and in his 1982 monograph on Shakespeare's influence on his contemporaries. The majority view, however, first advanced in a rebuttal of Honigmann's views by Kenneth Muir, holds that the Troublesome Reign antedates King John by a period of several years; and that the skilful plotting of the Troublesome Reign is neither unparalleled in the period, nor proof of Shakespeare's involvement.

Shakespeare derived from Holinshed's Chronicles certain verbal collocations and points of action. (Note: Although the author of the Troublesome Reign also drew upon Holinshed's work, the appearance in King John of material derived from Holinshed but unexampled in the other play suggests both authors independently consulted the Chronicles.) Honigmann discerned in the play the influence of John Foxe's Acts and Monuments, Matthew Paris's Historia Maior, and the Latin Wakefield Chronicle, but Muir demonstrated that this apparent influence could be explained by the priority of the Troublesome Reign, which contains similar or identical matter. (Note: With the exception of Eleanor's dying on 1 April, which Muir argues was derived not from the Wakefield Chronicle, as Honigmann had argued, but from the conjunction of Eleanor's death and a description of an inauspicious celestial omen on 1 April on a particular page of Holinshed.)

== Date and text ==
The date of composition is unknown, but must lie somewhere between 1587, the year of publication of the second, revised edition of Holinshed's Chronicles, upon which Shakespeare drew for this and other plays, and 1598, when King John was mentioned among Shakespeare's plays in the Palladis Tamia of Francis Meres. The editors of the Oxford Shakespeare conclude from the play's incidence of rare vocabulary, use of colloquialisms in verse, pause patterns, and infrequent rhyming that the play was composed in 1596, after Richard II but before Henry IV, Part I.

King John was first printed in 1623 as part of the First Folio. A play titled The Troublesome Reign of King John attributed to Shakespeare first printed in 1591 exists, but modern scholars dismiss the attribution as extremely unlikely to be legitimate.

King John is one of only two plays by Shakespeare that are entirely written in verse, the other being Richard II.

== Performance history ==
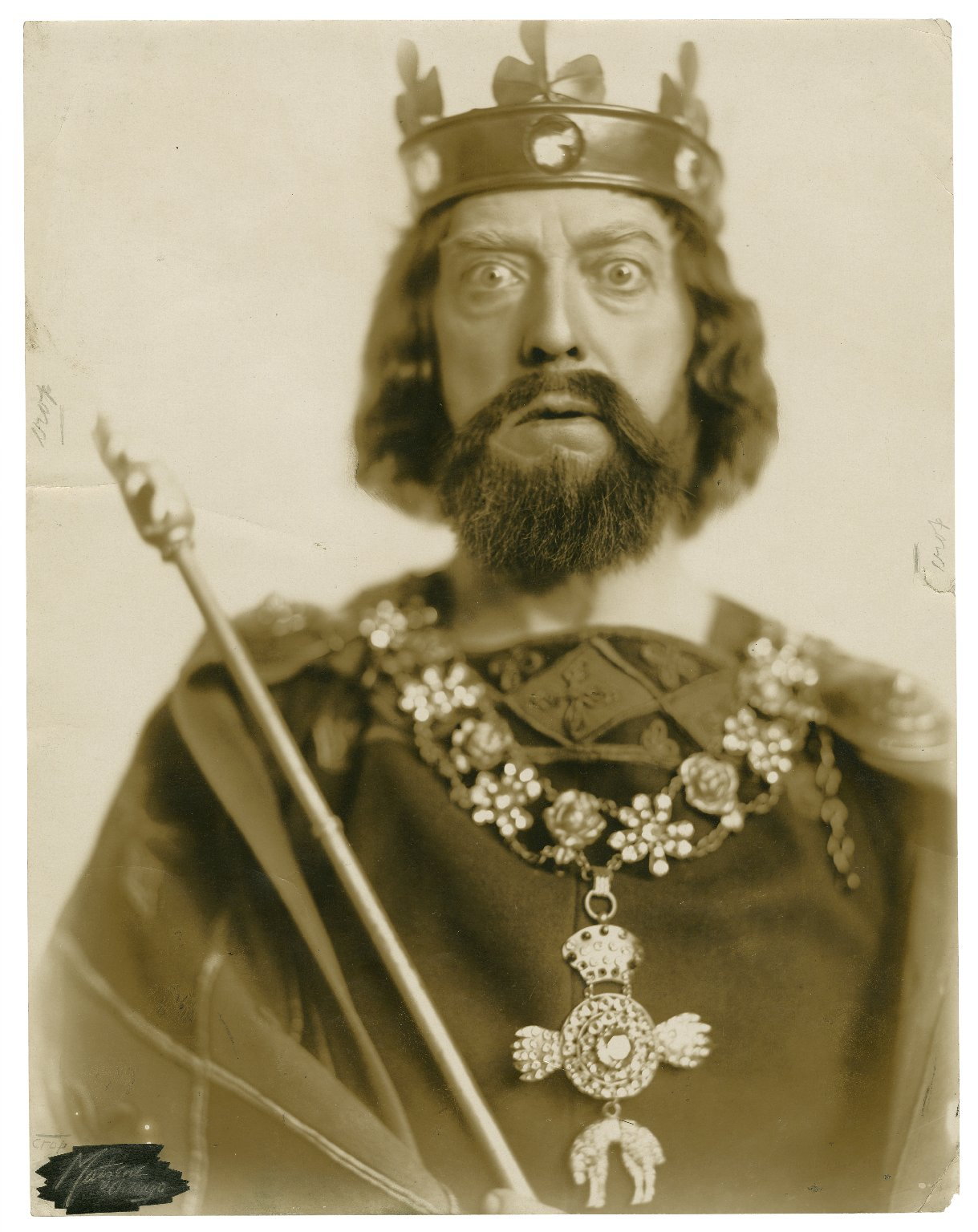
A photograph of Robert B. Mantell as King John

The earliest documented performance dates from 1737, when John Rich staged a production at the Theatre Royal, Drury Lane. In 1745, the year of the Jacobite rebellion, competing productions were staged by Colley Cibber at Covent Garden and David Garrick at Drury Lane. Charles Kemble's 1823 production made a serious effort at historical accuracy, inaugurating the 19th century tradition of striving for historical accuracy in Shakespearean production. Other successful productions of the play were staged by William Charles Macready (1842) and Charles Kean (1846). Twentieth century revivals include Robert B. Mantell's 1915 production (the last production to be staged on Broadway) and Peter Brook's 1945 staging, featuring Paul Scofield as the Bastard.

In the Victorian era, King John was one of Shakespeare's most frequently staged plays, in part because its spectacle and pageantry were congenial to Victorian audiences. King John, however, has decreased in popularity: it is now one of Shakespeare's least-known plays and stagings of it are very rare. It has been staged four times on Broadway, the last time in 1915. It has also been staged five times from 1953 to 2014 at the Stratford Shakespeare Festival.

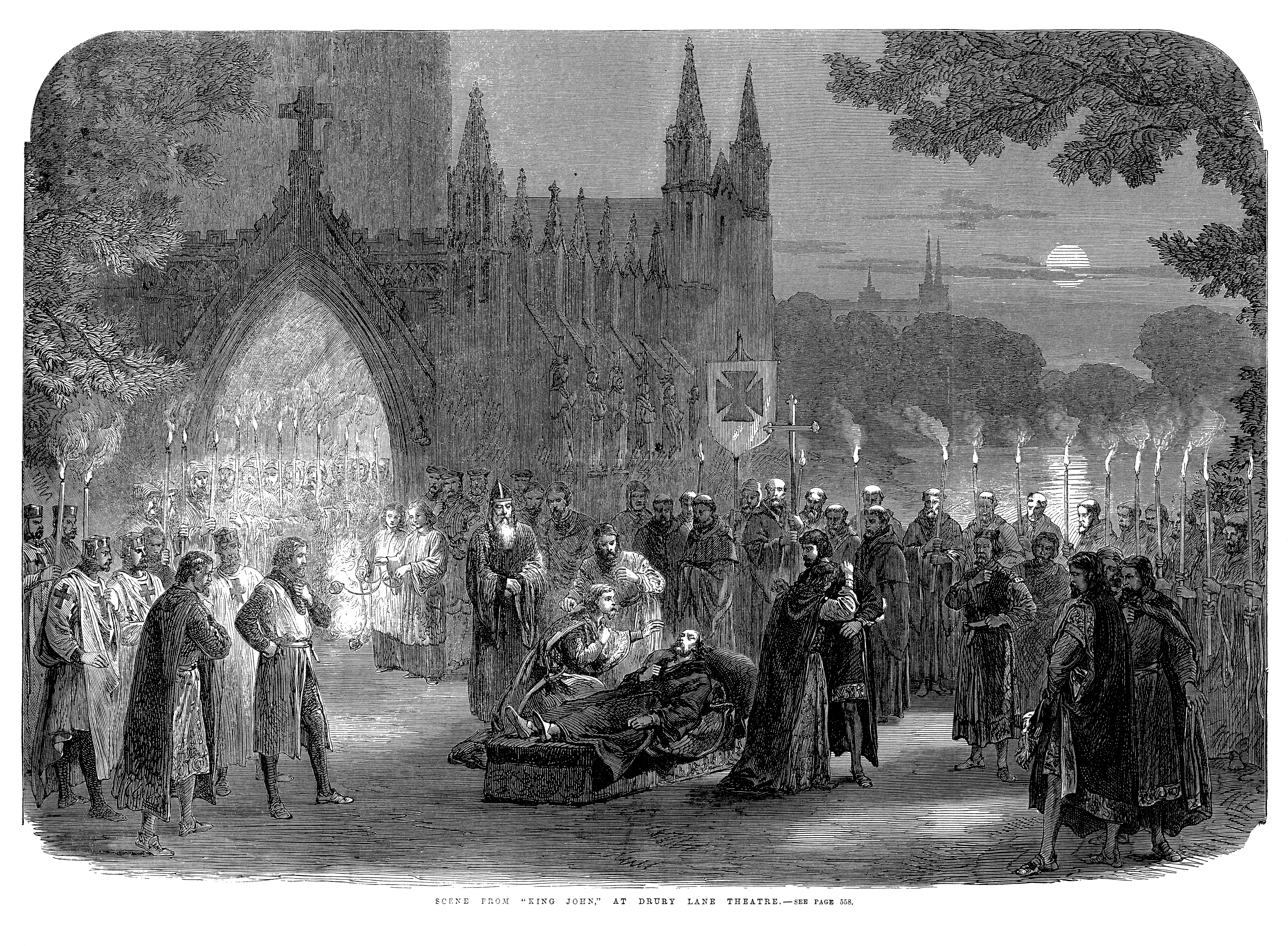
The death of King John, in an 1865 production of the play at the Drury Lane Theatre, London

Herbert Beerbohm Tree made a silent film version in 1899 entitled King John. It is a short film consisting of the King's death throes in Act V, Scene vii and is the earliest surviving film adaptation of a Shakespearean play. King John has been produced for television twice: in 1951 with Donald Wolfit and in 1984 with Leonard Rossiter as part of the BBC Television Shakespeare series of adaptations.

George Orwell specifically praised the play in 1942 for its view of politics: "When I had read it as a boy it seemed to me archaic, something dug out of a history book and not having anything to do with our own time. Well, when I saw it acted, what with its intrigues and doublecrossings, non-aggression pacts, quislings, people changing sides in the middle of a battle, and what-not, it seemed to me extraordinarily up to date."

=== Selected recent revivals ===
The Royal Shakespeare Company's 1974–5 production was heavily rewritten by director John Barton, who included material from The Troublesome Reign of King John, John Bale's King Johan (thought to be Shakespeare's own sources) and other works. It has also presented three productions of King John this century: in 2006 directed by Josie Rourke as part of their Complete Works Festival, in 2012 directed by Maria Aberg who cast a woman, Pippa Nixon, in the role of the Bastard.

The Oregon Shakespeare Festival has staged the play several times, most recently in 2022 in a production with a cast including non-binary actors.

The Chicago Shakespeare Theater on Navy Pier presented the play in its 1990–1991 season and again in 2003–2004.

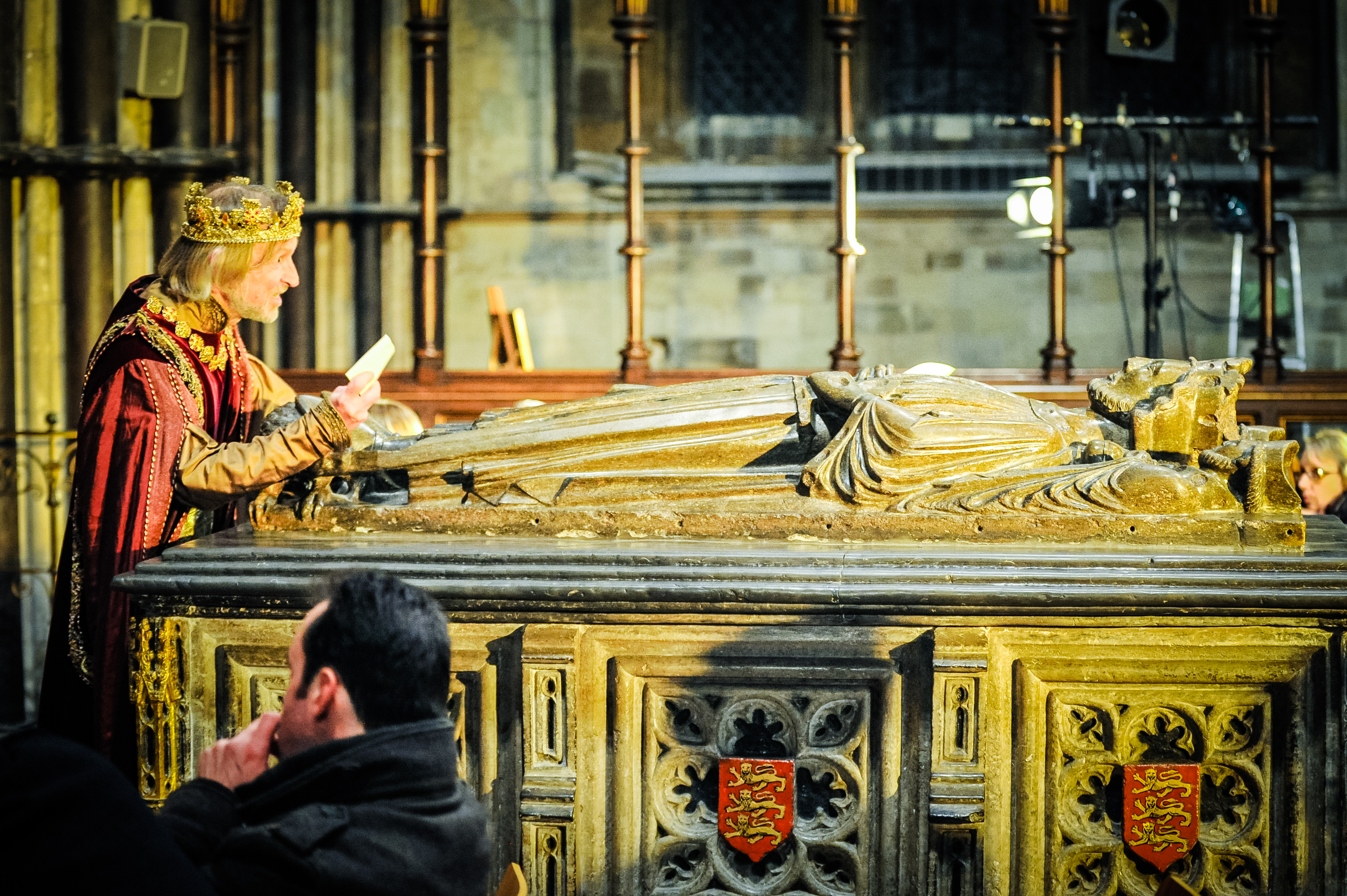
Phil Leach as King John in the 2016 Worcester Repertory Company production directed by Ben Humphrey, facing the real King John's tomb in Worcester Cathedral

In 2008, the Hudson Shakespeare Company of New Jersey produced King John as part of their annual Shakespeare in the Parks series. Director Tony White set the action in the medieval era but used a multi-ethnic and gender swapping cast.

New York's Theater for a New Audience presented a "remarkable" in-the-round production in 2000, emphasising Faulconbridge's introduction to court realpolitik to develop the audience's own awareness of the characters' motives. The director was Karin Coonrod.

In 2012, Bard on the Beach in Vancouver, British Columbia, put on a production. It was also performed as part of the 2013 season at the Utah Shakespeare Festival, recipient of America's Outstanding Regional Theatre Tony Award (2000), presented by the American Theatre Wing and the League of American Theatres and Producers.

The play was presented at Shakespeare's Globe, directed by James Dacre, as part of the summer season 2015 in the 800th anniversary year of Magna Carta. A co-production with Royal & Derngate, this production also played in Salisbury Cathedral, Temple Church and The Holy Sepulchre, Northampton.

The Rose Theatre, Kingston upon Thames, Surrey, hosted Sir Trevor Nunn's direction of the play during May and June 2016, in the quatercentenary year of Shakespeare's death and the 800th anniversary year of King John's death.

The Worcester Repertory Company staged a production of the play (directed by Ben Humphrey) in 2016 around the tomb of King John in Worcester Cathedral on the 800th anniversary of the king's death, with Phil Leach in the titular role.

== See also ==
- Blank verse
- Illegitimacy in fiction
- Gild the lily

== Sources ==
- Alexander, Peter (1929). Shakespeare's "Henry VI" and "Richard III". Cambridge.
- Alexander, Peter (1961). Shakespeare's Life and Art. New York University Press.
- Dickson, Andrew (2009). Staines, Joe (ed.). The Rough Guide to Shakespeare. Rough Guides (2nd ed.). London, UK. ISBN 978-1-85828-443-9.
- Jowett, John; Montgomery, William; Taylor, Gary; Wells, Stanley, eds. (2005) [1986]. The Oxford Shakespeare: The Complete Works (2nd ed.). New York, NY: Oxford University Press. ISBN 0-19-926718-9.
- Holderness, Graham; McCullough, Christopher (2002) [1986]. "Shakespeare on the Screen: A selective filmography". In Wells, Stanley (ed.). Shakespeare Survey. Vol. 39. Cambridge University Press. ISBN 0-521-52377-X.
- Honigmann, E.A.J. (1983) [1982]. Shakespeare's Impact on his Contemporaries. Hong Kong: The Macmillan Press Ltd. ISBN 0-333-26938-1.
- Hunter, G.K. (1997). English Drama 1586–1642: The age of Shakespeare. The Oxford history of English Literature. Oxford, UK: Clarendon Press. ISBN 0-19-812213-6.
- McMillin, Scott; MacLean, Sally-Beth (1999) [1998]. The Queen's Men and Their Plays. Cambridge University Press. ISBN 0-521-59427-8.
- Muir, Kenneth (1977). The Sources of Shakespeare's Plays. London: Methuen & Co Ltd. ISBN 0-416-56270-1.
- Shakespeare, William (1965) [1954]. Honigmann, E.A.J. (ed.). King John. Welwyn Garden City: Methuen & Co. Ltd.
- Shakespeare, William (1990). Beaurline, L.A. (ed.). King John (The New Cambridge Shakespeare). Cambridge University Press. ISBN 978-0-521-29387-7.
- Shakespeare, William (2008) [1989]. Braunmuller, A. R. (ed.). The life and death of King John. Oxford World's Classics. New York, NY: Oxford University Press. ISBN 978-0-19-953714-3.
- Tillyard, E.M.W. (1956) [1944]. Shakespeare's History Plays. London, UK: Chatto & Windus.
- Wells, Stanley; Taylor, Gary; Jowett, John; Montgomery, William (1987). William Shakespeare: a textual companion. New York, NY: Oxford University Press. ISBN 0-19-812914-9.
