= Howe Institute (Louisiana) =

African-American school in New Iberia, LA (c. 1893 to 1933)

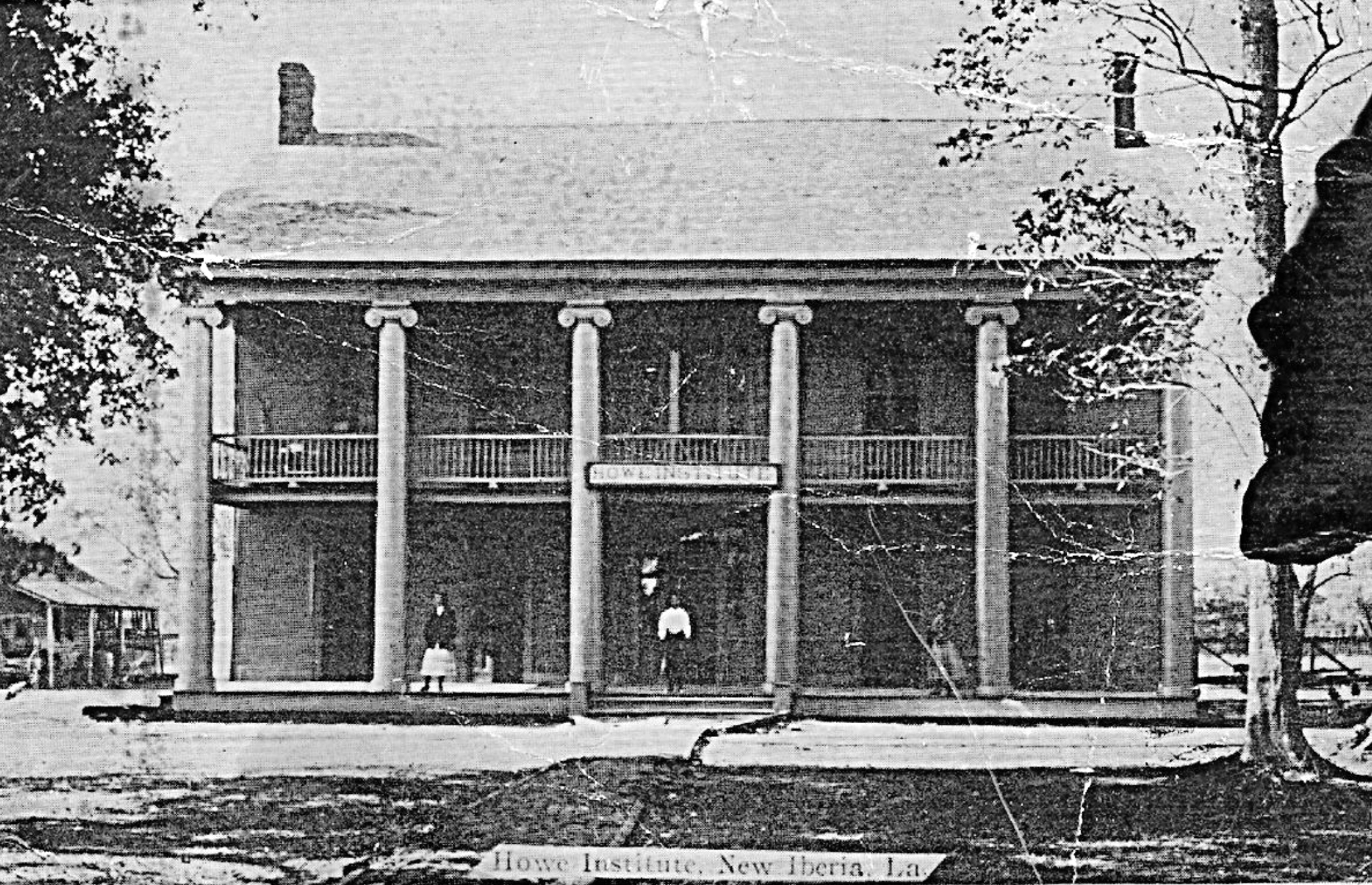

Location
- 300 Iberia Street, New Iberia, Iberia Parish, Louisiana, U.S. 30.004962°N 91.821189°W

Information
- School type: Private primary and grammar
- Religious affiliation: Baptist
- Opened: c. 1888
- Founder: Jonas Henderson
- Closed: 1933
- President: Jonas Henderson
- Affiliation: American Missionary Association

The Howe Institute was an African-American private Baptist primary and grammar school in operation from c. 1888 to 1933 in New Iberia, Louisiana. The founding president of the school was Jonas Henderson. A historical marker for the school is located at the Iberia Parish Court Building in New Iberia.

== History ==
The Wakefield Institute in New Iberia was an African-American private college that preceded Howe Institute, established by Samuel Wakefield. It closed in 1874 after damage from a tornado.

There is debate on the date of founding of the Howe Institute, some sources state it was opened in 1888, and others state it was either 1890 or 1896. The campus was located between Washington, Iberia, Madison, and Providence streets (present day 300 Iberia Street) in New Iberia. The founding president/principal of the Howe Institute was Jonas Henderson, and a sponsor for the school was the Union 6th District Missionary Baptist Association. The school opening was financed by the St. Paul Congregational Church (now known as Church of Jesus Christ New Iberia) under the church leadership of Byron Gunner, with assistance of the American Missionary Association and with an endowment from philanthropist Peter Howe of Illinois. Prior to moving to New Iberia, principal Jonas Henderson had been a professor and the chair of the mathematics and history departments at Leland University in New Orleans.

In 1896, the enrollment was 85 students, and the school offered student boarding. In the 1890s the school operated as a primary school and grammar school.

On April 14, 1915, Booker T. Washington, visited Howe Institute as a part of his historic tour of Black schools in Louisiana; this speaking engagement brought thousands of people together in attendance. The Howe campus had served as a temporary refugee camp for Black citizens following the 1927 flood.

In 2021, the Iberia African American Historical Society (IAAHS) sponsored the creation of the Howe Institute Historical Marker in New Iberia. An older version of the Howe Institute Historical Marker existed in the same location, but it did not include details about the historical impacts.
