= Hugo von Radolin =

Prussian statesman (1841–1917)

His Serene Highness The Prince of Radolin
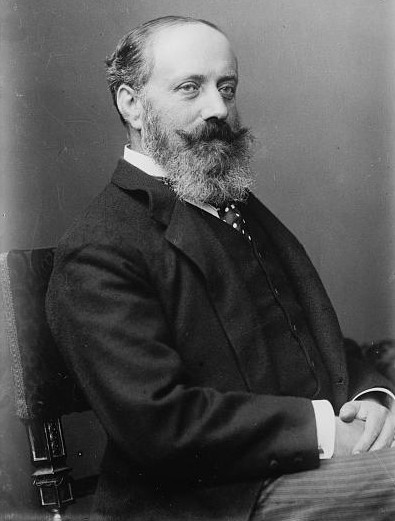
- Hugo von Radolin in 1915
- Full name: Hugo Julius Raoul Eduard
- Born: 1 April 1841; Posen, Kingdom of Prussia
- Died: 12 July 1917 (aged 76); Jarotschin, German Empire
- Buried: St. Martin's Church, Jarotschin
- Spouses: Lucy Catherine Wakefield (m. 1863; died 1880) Countess Johanna von Oppersdorff (m. 1892)
- Father: Count Ladislaus von Radolin-Radolinski
- Mother: Countess Josephine von Radolin-Radolinski

Arms of Princes von Radolin-Radolinski

Hugo, Prince of Radolin (German: Hugo Fürst von Radolin; 1 April 1841 – 12 July 1917), born Hugo Julius Raoul Eduard Graf Leszczyc von Radolin-Radolinski, was a German aristocrat of Polish descent, statesman who served as an ambassador for the Kingdom of Prussia and later, the German Empire, as well as a high-ranking official in the royal and imperial courts.

== Early life ==
Hugo was born into the old Polish noble family of Radolin-Radoliński, the son of Count Ladislaus von Radolin-Radolinski (1808–1879), a member of the Prussian House of Lords who served as a chamberlain in the court of King Frederick William IV, and of his cousin Josephine von Radolin-Radolinski (1809-1880). He was a direct descendant of Piotr Wysz Radoliński, a member of the Leszczyc clan who was one of the witnesses to the signing of the Union of Horodło in 1413. Radolinski had also served as bishop of Kraków and Poznań, as well as royal chancellor of the court during the reign of King Władysław II Jagiełło and Queen Jadwiga.

As a child, Hugo spent much of his time between the family estates in Borzęciczki, Sierniki, and Jarocin, before moving with his mother to Dresden in 1847. He studied political science and law in Bonn, during which he met and befriended Friedrich von Holstein, the future head of the political department of the German Foreign Office. In 1860 he joined the Prussian Army as a one-year volunteer in the 7th Hussars Regiment, before being appointed as a second lieutenant in the 2nd Life-Hussars Regiment. Upon the completion of his military service, Hugo returned to his studies, and graduated from the University of Berlin in December 1862.

== Diplomatic career ==
After working at a district court in Pleschen from 1864 to 1866, Radolin-Radolinski officially entered the diplomatic service. He was firstly an attaché as part of the Prussian legation to Florence in 1869, before serving as a secretary at the Prussian embassy in Paris and later, chargé d'affaires in Stuttgart in that year. During the Franco-Prussian War, he worked at the high command of the occupying forces in France, as a member of the delegation from Prussia's Ministry of Foreign Affairs. Two years later, in 1874, he was dispatched by Imperial Chancellor Otto von Bismarck to Madrid as Germany's first ambassador to Spain, and in that same year he was transferred to Dresden. In 1876, he became Germany's first ambassador to the Ottoman Empire, representing Russia's interests during the Russo-Turkish War. He inherited his father's seat in the House of Lords in 1880.

Upon his return to Europe in 1881, Radolin-Radolinski worked as ambassador to Weimar before he was appointed marshal of the court (German: Hofmarschall) to the German Crown Prince, the future Emperor Frederick III, in 1884. Bismarck initially opposed the appointment, due to Radolin-Radolinski's Polish and Catholic background, but gradually relented; it was even claimed by Franz von Roggenbach that Radolin-Radolinski was a spy for Bismarck. He became a close confidante of the chancellor, as well as the Crown Prince and his wife; similarly to the latter, he shared their favour of a foreign policy friendly to Great Britain, in opposition to Bismarck's pro-Russian policy. It was Radolin-Radolinski who, against the wishes of the Empress, informed Frederick's son Prince Wilhelm of his father's terminal illness. For his services to the imperial family Wilhelm II, the new German Emperor, elevated him to the title of Prince (Fürst) of Radolin in 1888, and appointed him chief seneschal of the court (German: Oberhoftruchseß) and a member of the Privy Council.

He was German ambassador to the Russian Empire from 1895 to 1901.

== Later life ==
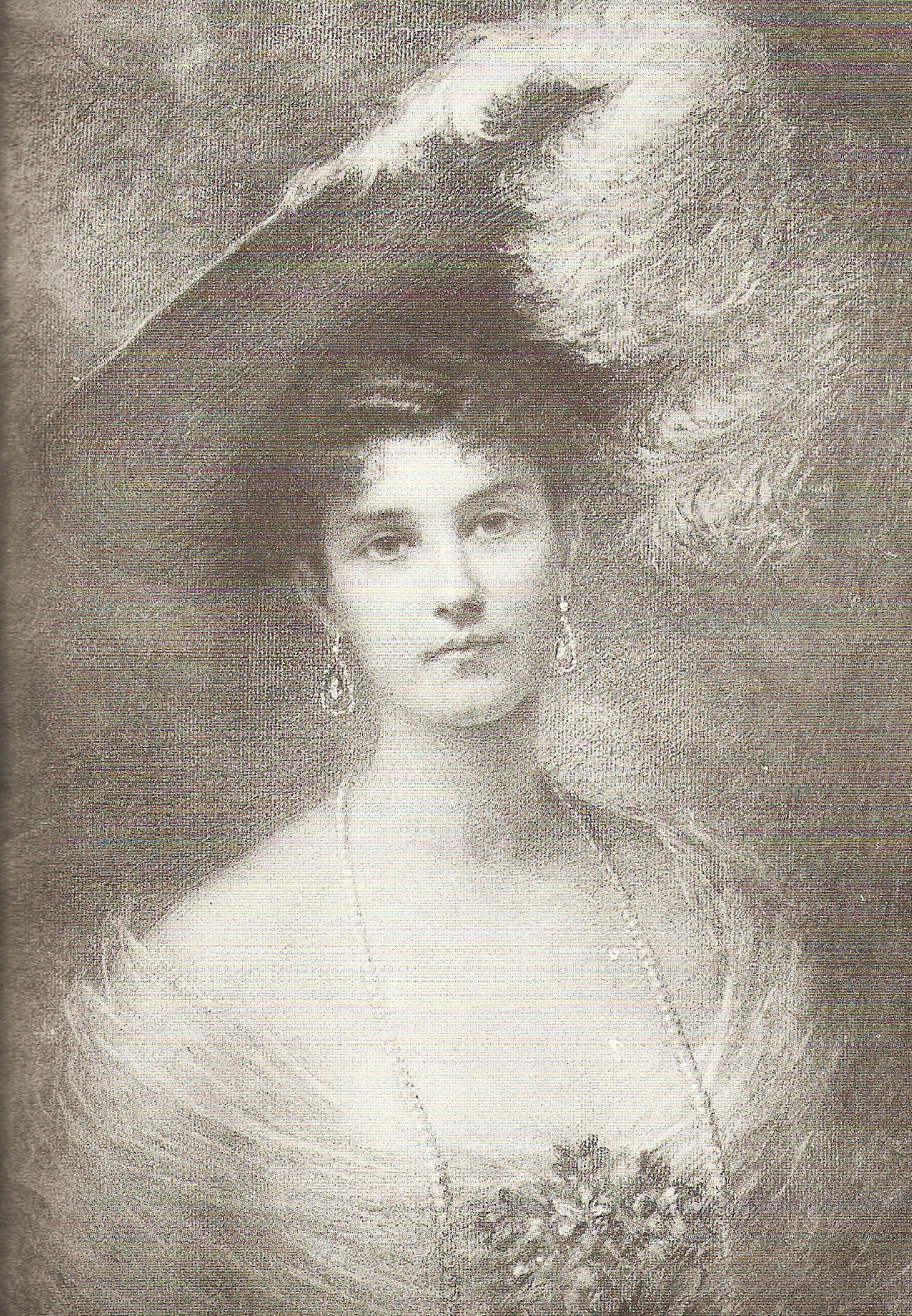
Hugo's second wife: Princess Johanna von Radolin-Radolinska née Countess von Oppersdorff (1864–1947)

Upon his retirement, Radolin returned to Jarocin, where he focused on expanding his estate between 1911 and 1914. On 19 June 1915, The New York Times reported that Radolin and his wife were arrested in April and charged with espionage against the Triple Entente; they later clarified that the couple were simply requested to return to their home, where they were placed under house arrest.

Prince Radolin died in 1917, and was interred in the family crypt in St. Martin's Church in Jarotschin, Poland.

== Marriages and issue ==
On 4 July 1863 in London, Radolin-Radolinski married firstly Lucy Catherine Wakefield (1841-1880), the daughter of British Lieutenant-colonel John Howard Wakefield (1803-1862) and his Indian wife Maria Isobel (1814-1852), Christian-convert daughter of the Hereditary Vizier of Bushahr. From this marriage, they had four children.

After Lucy's death from tuberculosis, Radolin married secondly in Oberglogau on 4 June 1892 to Countess Johanna Elisabeth Karoline Philomena von Oppersdorff (1864–1947), eldest daughter of Count Hans von Oppersdorff (1832-1877) and his wife, Elisabeth Alexandrine Florence of Talleyrand-Périgord (1844-1880), daughter of Alexandre de Talleyrand-Périgord, Duke of Dino and granddaughter of Princess Dorothea of Courland. The wedding was a grand affair attended by Wilhelm II himself. They had three children from this marriage.

== Titles, honours and awards ==
- Granted the noble title of Prince (Fürst), April 1888
- Honorary Citizen of the City of Jarotschin, 1897

=== Orders and decorations ===
- Prussia:
  - Iron Cross (1870), 2nd Class on White Band
  - Knight of the Red Eagle, 2nd Class with Oak Leaves, 18 January 1884; 1st Class, 27 January 1892; Grand Cross with Crown and in Brilliants
  - Knight of the Royal Crown Order, 1st Class
  - Grand Commander's Cross of the Royal House Order of Hohenzollern, 1 April 1900
  - Knight of the Black Eagle, 15 June 1898; with Collar, 17 January 1899
- Baden: Grand Cross of the Zähringer Lion, 1888
- Bavaria: Grand Cross of the Merit Order of St. Michael, 1886
- (Saxe-Coburg and Gotha) (Duchy of Saxe-Altenburg) (Saxe-Meiningen) Ernestine duchies: Grand Cross of the Saxe-Ernestine House Order, 1884
- Greece: Grand Commander of the Redeemer
- Grand Duchy of Hesse: Grand Cross of the Merit Order of Philip the Magnanimous, with Crown, 24 May 1888
- Mecklenburg: Grand Cross of the Wendish Crown, with Crown in Gold
- Saxe-Weimar-Eisenach: Grand Cross of the White Falcon, 1884
- Saxony: Grand Cross of the Albert Order, with Star in Gold, 1892
- Schwarzburg: Princely Schwarzburg Cross of Honour, 1st Class
- Waldeck and Pyrmont: Order of Merit, 1st Class
- Württemberg: Grand Cross of the Württemberg Crown, 1892
- (Austrian Empire) (Kingdom of Hungary) Austria-Hungary: Grand Cross of the Imperial Order of Leopold, 1889
- Bulgaria: Grand Cross of St. Alexander
- France: Grand Cross of the Legion of Honour, 9 February 1909 – for his participation in the Morocco Convention
- Italy: Knight of Saints Maurice and Lazarus
- Sovereign Military Order of Malta: Knight, 1869; Knight of Honour and Devotion
- Monaco: Grand Cross of St. Charles, 3 April 1905
- Ottoman Empire:
  - Order of Osmanieh, 1st Class in Brilliants
  - Order of the Medjidie, 1st Class
  - Gold and Silver Imtiaz Medals
- Romania: Grand Cross of the Crown of Romania
- Russia: Knight of St. Alexander Nevsky
- Spain: Commander of the Order of Charles III

== Bibliography ==
- Fesser, Gerd (2003). Radolin, Hugo Fürst von. Vol. 21. Berlin: Duncker & Humblot. p. 97. ISBN 3-428-11202-4.
