= The Empty Space =

1968 book by Peter Brook

- Author: Peter Brook
- Language: English
- Publication date: 1968

The Empty Space is a 1968 book by the British director Peter Brook examining four modes or points of view on theatre: Deadly; Holy; Rough; and Immediate.

The book is based on a series of four lectures endowed by Granada Television and delivered at Manchester, Keele, Hull, and Sheffield Universities in England. The first lecture, on The Deadly Theatre, was delivered on 1 February 1965 at Manchester University. The lecture series helped to fund his long-planned trip to Afghanistan.

The work was considered controversial when first published in 1968 and received mixed reviews. However, it is now widely taught in higher education theatre studies courses and is regarded as "the seminal text of modern theatre".

The Empty Space is defined by Brook as "[A]ny space in which theatre takes place." "I can take any empty space and call it a bare stage. A man walks across this empty space whilst someone else is watching him, and this is all that is needed for an act of theatre to be engaged".

== Empty Space Peter Brook Award ==
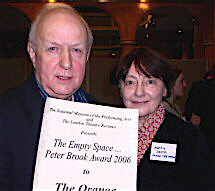
Sam Walters and Auriol Smith receiving the Empty Space Award for the Orange Tree Theatre in 2006

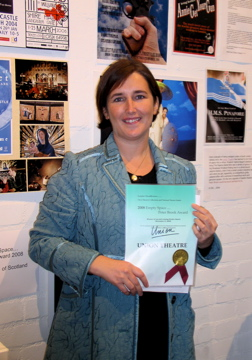
Sasha Regan, Union Theatre, London November 2008

The Empty Space Peter Brook Award was an annual prize awarded to a theatre in recognition of pioneering concepts and innovations in theatre achieved in smaller venues and inventive spaces which receive minimal or no public funding. Award categories included regional theatres and up-and-coming theatre. Winners include the Orange Tree Theatre, Richmond, London (2006 and 2015), the Finborough Theatre, West Brompton, London (2010 and 2012), the Shed at the National Theatre, London (2013) and the Unicorn Theatre, Southwark, London (2014), and The last award, to The Yard Theatre in Hackney Wick, London, was made in 2017.

== Bibliography ==
- Brook, Peter (1968). The Empty Space: A Book About the Theatre: Deadly, Holy, Rough, Immediate. ISBN 978-0-684-82957-9
- Kustow, Michael (2006). Peter Brook: a biography. ISBN 0-7475-7913-X
