= Swan Theatre =

Swan Theatre may refer to:

- The Swan (theatre), an Elizabethan playhouse
- Swan Theatre, Stratford-upon-Avon, a theatre belonging to the Royal Shakespeare Company in Stratford-upon-Avon, England
- Swan Theatre, Worcester, a theatre in Worcester, England
- Wycombe Swan, a theatre in High Wycombe, Buckinghamshire, England
