= Swan Theatre, Worcester =

Theatre in Worcester, England

Coordinates: 52.1967544°N 2.2289751°W

Swan Theatre
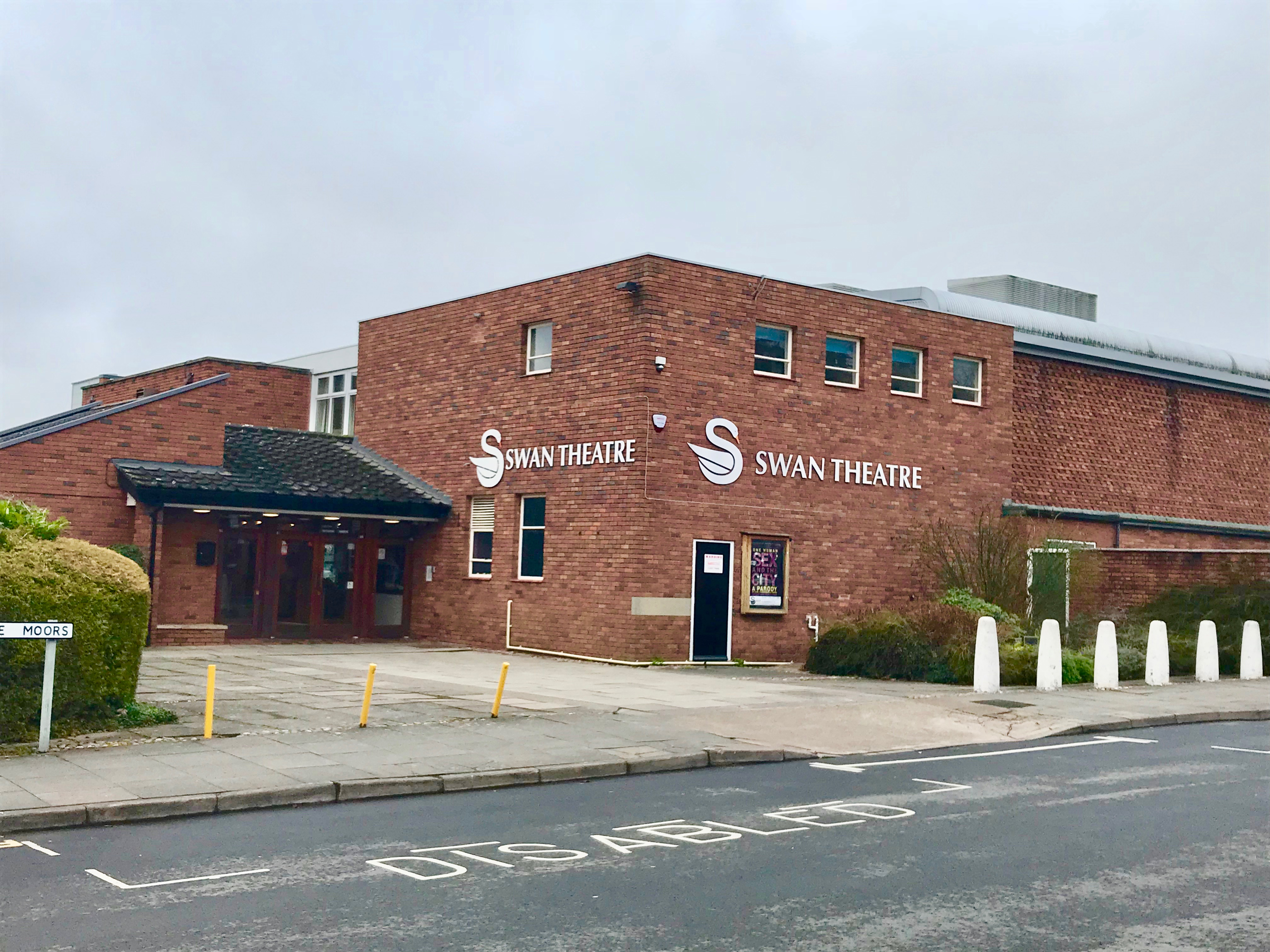
- Swan Theatre, Worcester
- Interactive map of Swan Theatre
- Address: The Swan Theatre; The Moors; Worcester; WR1 3ED; United Kingdom
- Owner: Worcester Live Charitable Trust & Worcester Repertory Company
- Capacity: 350
- Type: Proscenium arch

Construction
- Opened: 1965
- Architect: Henry Gorst

Website
- worcester-rep.co.uk/swantheatre

The Swan Theatre is a theatre currently run by the Worcester Theatres Charitable Trust in Worcester, England. It is the official residence of the Worcester Repertory Company, Swan Youth Theatre and Young Rep. It stages drama, music, dance and spoken word as well as being hired out to local, regional and national amateur groups. It was built in 1965 and was designed by Henry Gorst. The Swan Theatre was built a decade after the demolition of the Worcester Theatre Royal, which was condemned due to fire damage.

The theatre has undergone two major refurbishments since it was built. One in the late 1970s which added a studio theatre, office spaces and workshop space and another in 2009. The 2009 refurbishment installed air-handling in the theatre's main house as well as the removal of asbestos and the inclusion of a public balcony in the bar and foyer area. In addition to the 350 seat main house auditorium the theatre has a 50 seat studio space, The Vesta Tilley Studio, named after Music Hall star and Worcester born performer, Vesta Tilley.

== Directors ==
Since the opening of the theatre there have been nine directors. Since the founding of the Worcester Repertory Company in 1967 the Artistic Director of the WRC has been the de facto Director of the Swan Theatre, serving both as the Administrative and Artistic head of the company.

Artistic Director	Starting Year	Ending Year
Sara Knight MBE*	1965	1967
John Hole**	1967	1974
Michael Winter	1974	1977
Patrick Masefield OBE	1977	1982
John Doyle	1982	1985
John Ginman	1985	1988
Pat Trueman	1988	1994
Jenny Stephens	1994	2002
Chris Jaeger MBE	2003	2019
Ben Humphrey	2019	2020
Sarah-Jane Morgan	2019	

|-

* Director of the Swan Theatre only.

** Founding Director of the Worcester Repertory Company.

The theatre has had many Associate and Assistant Directors which have included Phyllida Lloyd CBE, David Wood OBE, Richard Digby Day, Paul Clarkson, and Sam Walters.

== Patrons ==
There have been four Patrons of the theatre since its opening.

Dame Peggy Ashcroft, John Doyle, Lord Faulkner of Worcester and its current patron, Imelda Staunton CBE. Imelda Staunton's professional debut was at the Swan Theatre with the Worcester Repertory Company and she became the Patron during the Golden Anniversary of the theatre in 2015.

Rufus Norris, the current Director of the National Theatre serves as the Swan Youth Theatre and Young Rep's patron. Rufus Norris was a member of the Swan Youth Theatre before making his professional debut with the Worcester Repertory Company, appearing in John Doyle's production of Cabaret.
