= Charles Wakefield =

Charles Wakefield may refer to:

- Charles Wakefield (cricketer) (1900–1969), South African cricketer
- Charles Wakefield, 1st Viscount Wakefield (1859–1941), English businessman, founded of the Castrol lubricants company
- Charles Wakefield (numismatist) (1834–1919), British artist, teacher and museum curator

== See also ==
- Charlie Wakefield (disambiguation)
- Charles Wakefield Cadman, American composer
