= Peter Wakefield =

Peter Wakefield may refer to:

- Peter Wakefield (boxer) (born 1977), retired light flyweight boxer from Australia
- Peter Wakefield (diplomat) (1922–2010), British diplomat and art fund director
- Peter of Wakefield (died 1213), English hermit
