= Ben Humphrey =

English actor

Ben Humphrey FRSA GoDA ALAM
- Born: 28 May 1986 (age 40); Worcester, U.K.
- Education: Bristol Old Vic Theatre School
- Occupations: Actor; Director; Playwright; Lecturer; Magistrate
- Years active: 1998–present
- Title: Fellow of the Royal Society of Arts | Magistrate

Ben Humphrey (born 28 May 1986 in Worcester, U.K.) is an English actor, director, writer, lecturer and criminal court Magistrate. He graduated from Bristol Old Vic Theatre School in 2007 and is also an associate of LAMDA.

He was the Artistic Director of the Worcester Repertory Company and Swan Theatre in Worcester as well as an Associate Research Fellow and Lecturer at the University of Worcester. As well as appearing in theatrical productions he has had a number of roles in Film and TV, including Just Charlie, the Hellraiser Chronicles (as part of the Hellraiser film universe), Noddy and Doctors.

In 2009 he was admitted as a member of the Guild of Drama Adjudicators (GoDA) and adjudicates theatre festivals both in the UK and internationally. In 2011 he was made an Associate Research Fellow for the University of Worcester and in 2012 was made a Fellow of the Royal Society of Arts. In 2016 he was made a patron of the Royal Air Force Theatrical Association along with Sir Peter Hall, Stephen Daldry and Gillian Plowman. In 2017 he was appointed as a Justice of the Peace in the Worcestershire Criminal Courts.

In 2015–16 his production of The Comedy of Errors (originally produced with the Worcester Repertory Company) was transferred to the National Theatre of Romania, Craiova as part of the International Shakespeare Festival. In 2016 he directed the 800th Anniversary production of William Shakespeare's King John. The production was staged around the tomb of the King in Worcester Cathedral, 800 years after the death of the monarch.

In 2018 he was nominated for a What's On Reader's Award for Best Pantomime Dame. In 2020 he was once again nominated for a What's On Reader's Award for Best Pantomime Dame and also received a nomination for Best Director at the Great British Pantomime Awards.

In 2021 he became the Artistic Director of Tortive Theatre and directed the one-person show, Shakespeare's Fool. The play was a fictional account of the Shakespearean actor and clown, William Kempe. The play was originally staged at the 2021 Edinburgh Fringe.

== Selected productions as director ==
- 2021 Shakespeare's Fool for Tortive Theatre at the Edinburgh Fringe 2021.
- 2019 Snow White & the Seven Dwarfs for The Worcester Repertory Company at The Swan Theatre, Worcester
- 2018 Maid Marian and Her Merry Men for The Worcester Repertory Company at The Swan Theatre, Worcester
- 2018 Macbeth for The Worcester Repertory Company (Young Rep.)
- 2018 A Soldier's Tale for The English Symphony Orchestra
- 2017 Sleeping Beauty for The Worcester Repertory Company at The Swan Theatre, Worcester
- 2017 Othello for The Worcester Repertory Company at Worcester Cathedral
- 2016 King John for The Worcester Repertory Company at Worcester Cathedral
- 2016 The Comedy of Errors for National Theatre of Romania, Craiova
- 2016 Façade for The English Symphony Orchestra
- 2016 Cinderella for The Worcester Repertory Company at The Swan Theatre, Worcester
- 2015 An Unhealthy Cure for The Worcester Repertory Company at The Vesta Tilley Studio, Worcester
