= African Americans in Louisiana =

Ethnic group in Louisiana

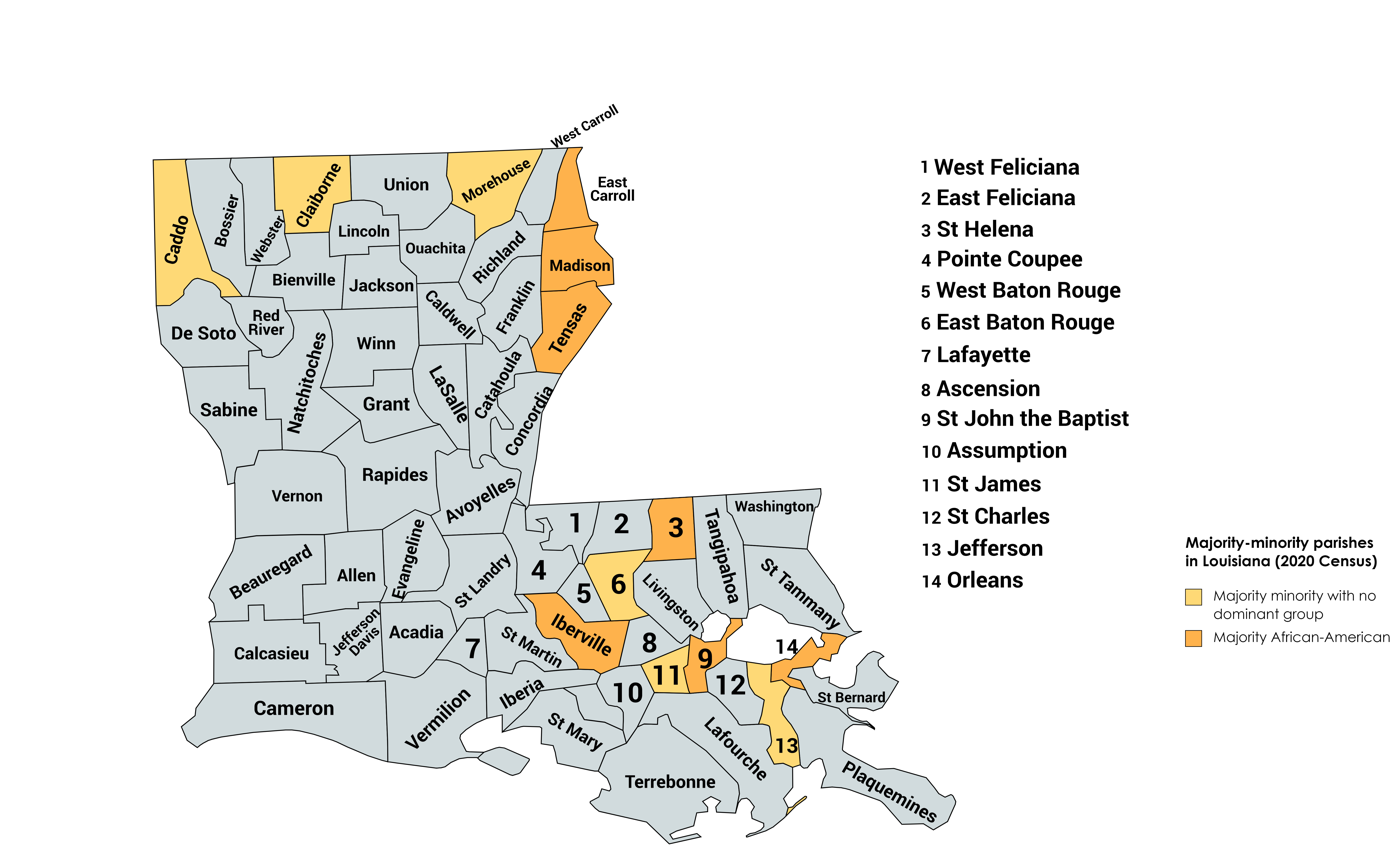

Total population
- 1.501 million (2020)

Regions with significant populations
- Orleans Parish and rural parishes along the Mississippi River Delta

Languages
- Southern American English, African American Vernacular English, Louisiana Creole, Louisiana French, Isleño Spanish, New Orleans English, Cajun English, Haitian Creole, African languages

Religion
- Christianity; Louisiana Voodoo, Hoodoo, African traditional religions

Related ethnic groups
- French Louisianians (Louisiana Creole people, Cajuns), Isleños, Redbones, Creoles of color

African Americans in Louisiana or Black Louisianians are residents of the US state of Louisiana who are of African ancestry; those native to the state since colonial times descend from the many African slaves working on indigo and sugarcane plantations under French colonial rule.

Within the US, Louisiana has the fifth-largest overall African American population. Louisiana has the second-largest percentage of African Americans in the country, only behind Mississippi. As of the 2020 US census, Black Louisianians of African heritage were 32.8% of the state's population.

== Demographics ==
In the 2020 Census, 1,464,023 Louisiana residents were identified as African American (31.4% of the total 4,657,757). In 6 of the state's 64 parishes, African Americans make up more than 50% of the population: East Carroll (69.6%), Madison (62.1%), St. John the Baptist (57.2%), Tensas (54.3%), Orleans (54.2%), and St. Helena (53.7%). African Americans in the ten parishes of Orleans Parish (208,273), East Baton Rouge (206,681), Jefferson (117,892), Caddo (115,298), Lafayette (61,086), Ouachita (59,083), Calcasieu (55,263), Rapides (40,484), Tangipahoa (40,039), and St. Landry (34,360) make up more than 64% of all African Americans in the state.

== History ==
The French introduced African slaves to the state after Spanish colonization and the death of Louisiana's Native American tribes.

The first enslaved people from Africa arrived in Louisiana in 1719 on the Aurore slave ship from Whydah, only a year after the founding of New Orleans. Twenty-three slave ships brought black slaves to Louisiana in French Louisiana alone, almost all embarking prior to 1730. Between 1723 and 1769, most African slaves imported to Louisiana were from modern-day Senegal, Mali, Congo, and Benin and many thousands being imported to Louisiana from there. A large number of the imported slaves from the Senegambia region were members of the Wolof and Bambara ethnic groups. Saint-Louis and Goree Island were sites where a great number of slaves destined for Louisiana departed from Africa. Very few slaves from the Ivory Coast and the Gold Coast were imported in Louisiana except the Mina who were among the most frequent ethnicities in this country. They belong to the Ewe group and their traditional domain is rather centered on the Mono River, encompassing eastern Ghana, the territory of modern Togo, and the west of modern Benin. It is more likely that most of the Mina transported to Louisiana were shipped from the Bight of Benin also known as the Slave Coast. During the Spanish control of Louisiana, between 1770 and 1803, most of the slaves still came from the Congo and the Senegambia region, but they imported also more slaves from modern-day Benin. Many slaves imported during this period were members of the Nago people, a Yoruba subgroup.

The slaves brought with them their cultural practices, languages, and religious beliefs rooted in spirit and ancestor worship, which were key elements of Louisiana Voodoo. In addition, in the late nineteenth century, many Afro-Haitians also migrated to Louisiana, contributing to the Voodoo tradition of the state.

During the American period (1804–1820), almost half of the African slaves came from the Congo Region.

Before the American Civil War (1861 to 1865), African Americans comprised the majority of the population in the state, with most being enslaved and working as laborers on sugar cane and cotton plantations.

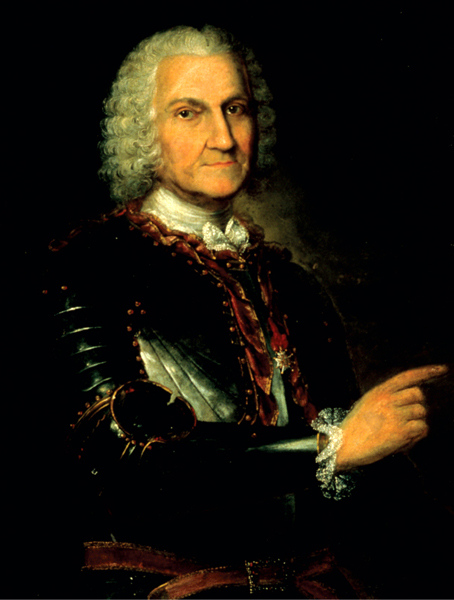
French explorer Jean-Baptiste Le Moyne de Bienville introduced black slavery in the region after the failed attempt of enslaving Louisiana's Indigenous population.

African Americans left Louisiana by the tens of thousands during the Great Migration in the first half of the 20th century, seeking work and political opportunities elsewhere. As of the 2010 U.S. Census, African Americans were 31.2% of the state's population.

Of all deaths from COVID-19 in 2020, African Americans in Louisiana died in greater numbers than any other racial group.

Louisiana Creoles in Louisiana are of French, Spanish, Native American, and African American ancestry. Creoles of color are Creoles with black ancestry who assimilated into Black culture. There is also an Afro-Gypsy community in Louisiana developed as a consequence of interracial marriage between freed African Americans and enslaved Roma.

== Education ==
There are six historically black colleges (HBCU) in Louisiana, with the Southern University System being the first and only HBCU college system in the United States.

== Culture ==
African Americans have contributed to Louisiana's culture, music, and cuisine. African slaves have influenced New Orleans dishes such as gumbo. African slaves also brought Louisiana Voodoo to the state. African Americans have influenced the music of Louisiana and helped develop jazz, blues, hip hop, R&B, Zydeco, and Bounce music in the state.

== Gallery ==
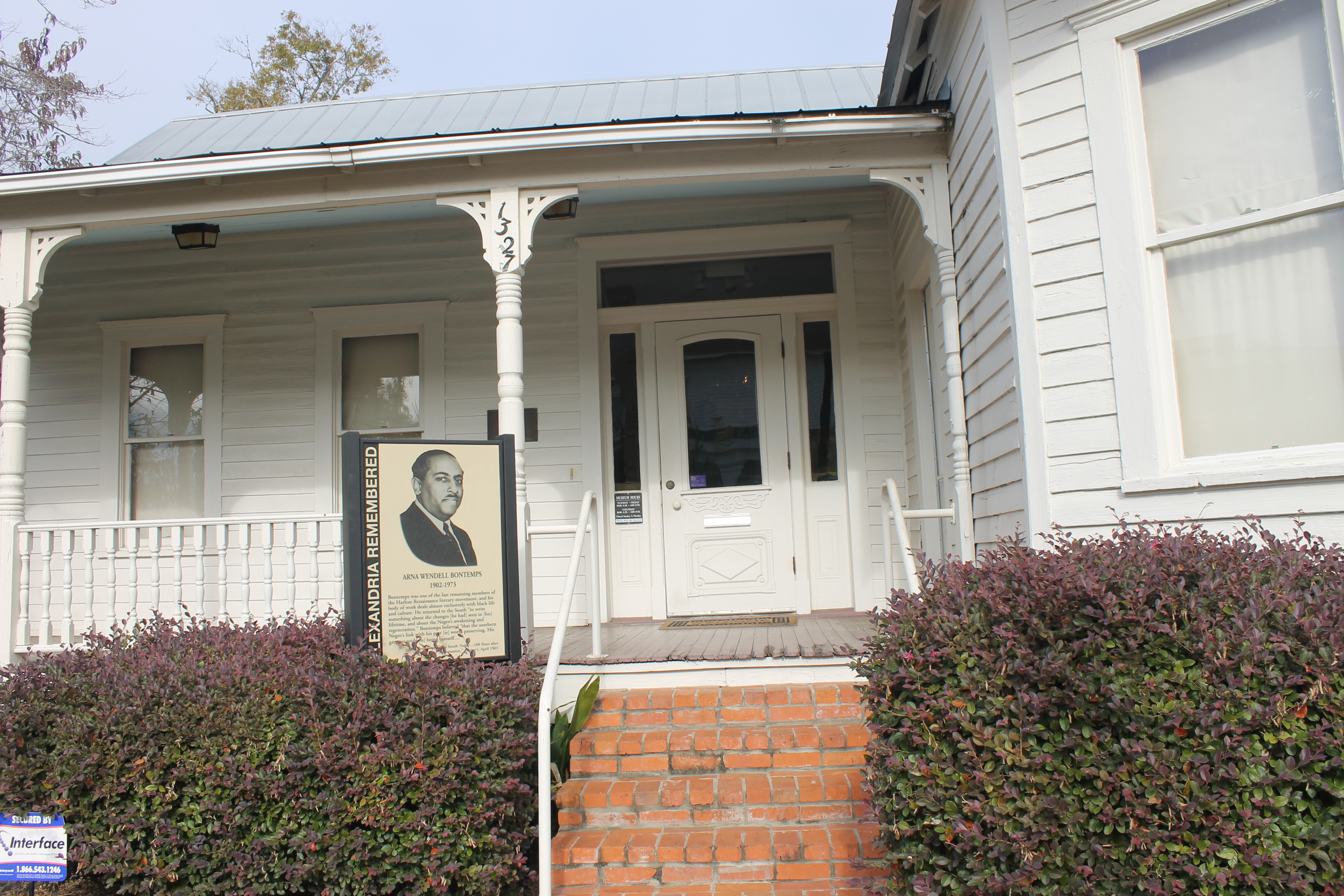

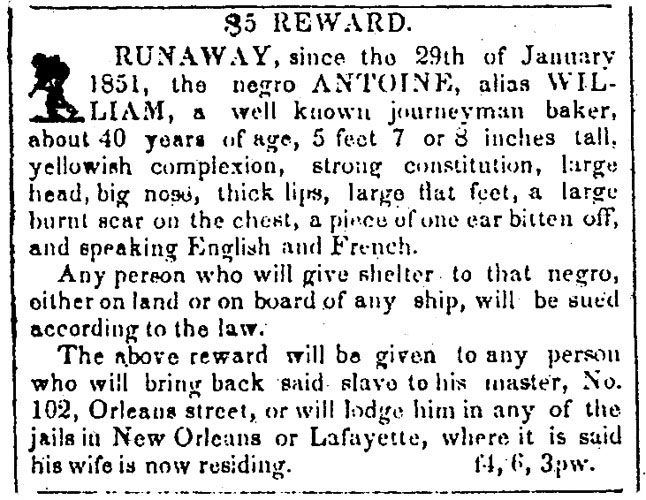

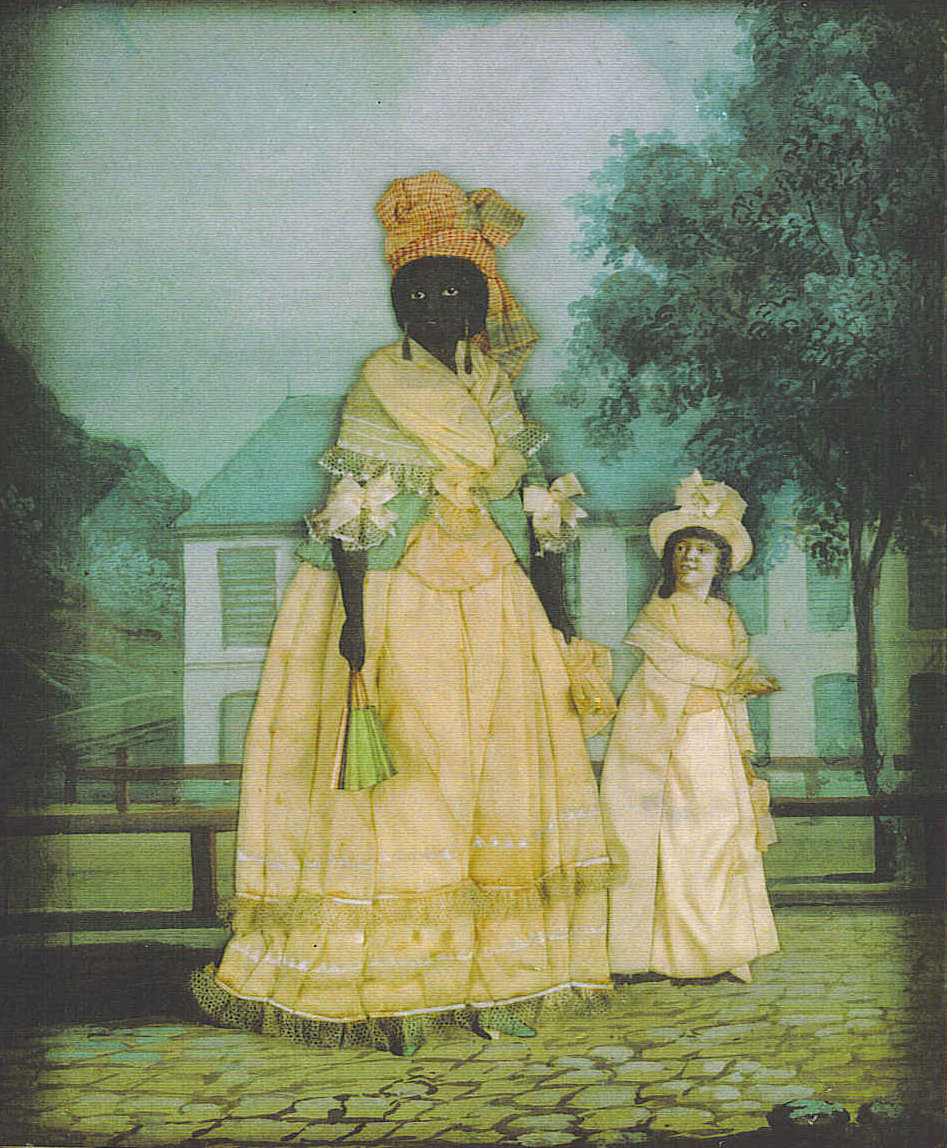

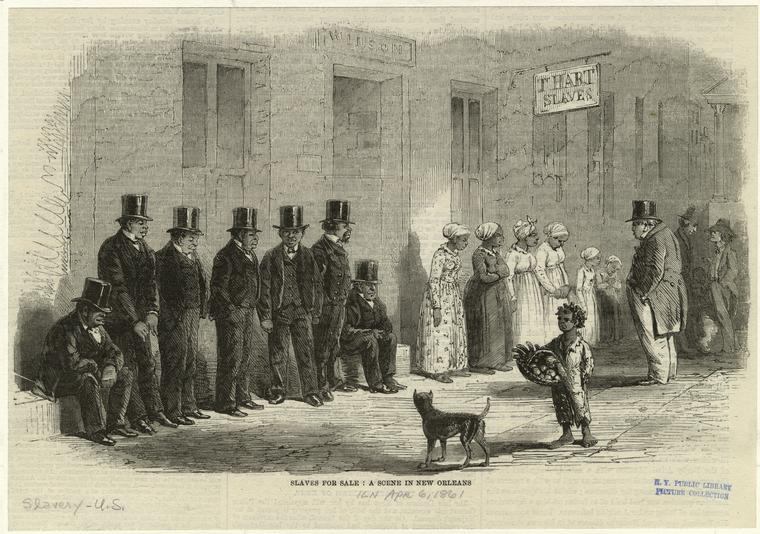

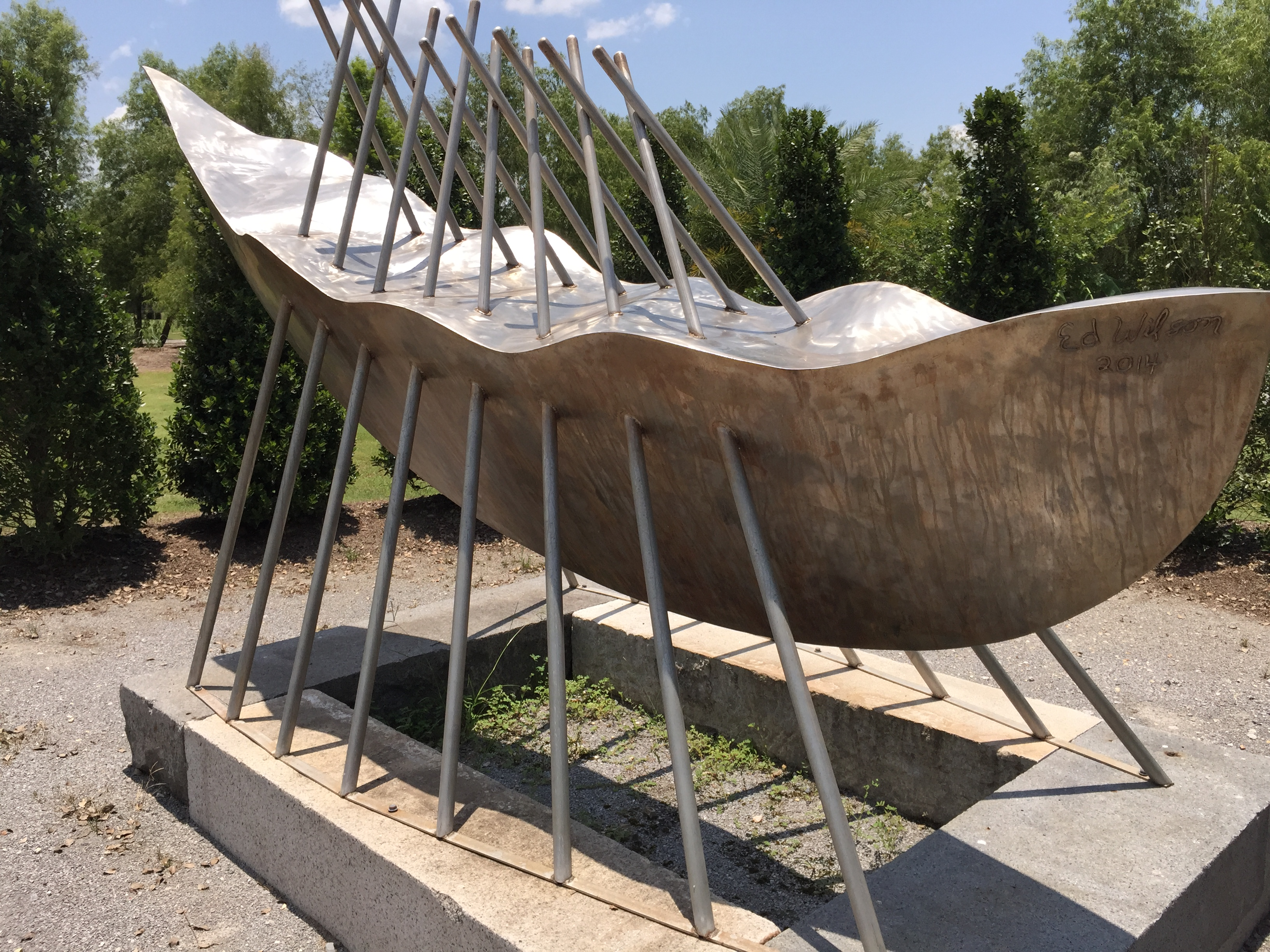

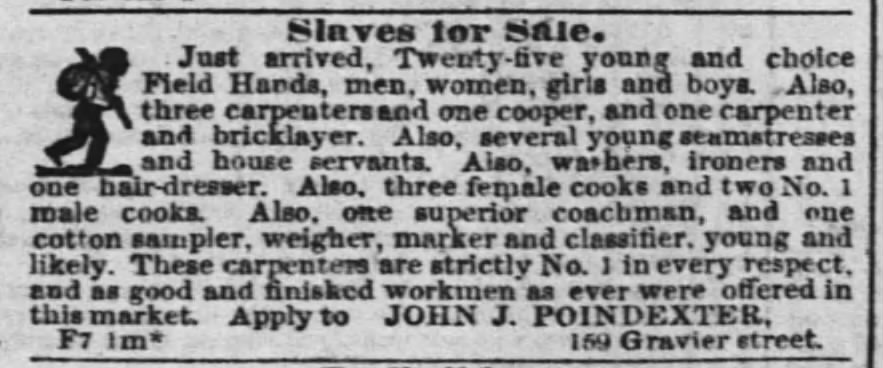

== Notable people ==
- Tyler Perry, actor
- Madam C. J. Walker, entrepreneur
- Louis Armstrong, trumpeter
- Mahalia Jackson, singer
- Fats Domino, rock n' roll pioneer
- Beyoncé, singer, most Grammy wins in world history
- Lil Wayne, musician
- Anthony Mackie, actor
- Bill Russell, professional basketball player
- Randy Jackson, bassist
- YoungBoy Never Broke Again, rapper
- Kevin Gates, rapper
- Johnnie Cochran, lawyer
- Clyde Drexler, former professional basketball player
- Karl Malone, former professional basketball player
- CeeDee Lamb, professor football player
- Bryan Christopher Williams, musician, entrepreneur
- P. B. S. Pinchback, former governor of Louisiana
- Sidney Bechet, musician
- Buddy Bolden, jazz pioneer
- James Booker, musician
- Master P, musician
- Mannie Fresh, record producer, musician
- Buddy Guy, blues musician
- Boosie Badazz, musician
- Juvenile, musician
- Ernie K-Doe, singer
- Ellis Marsalis Sr., jazz musician, civil rights activist
- Frank Ocean, Grammy Award-nominated R&B singer
- Wendell Pierce, actor
- Professor Longhair, musician
- Allen Toussaint, musician
- Buckwheat Zydeco, zydeco musician
- Jon Batiste, singer
- Willis Reed, professional basketball player.
- Rob49, rapper

== See also ==
- African Americans in New Orleans
- Creoles of color
- Louisiana Creole people
- Louisiana African American Heritage Trail
- Cajuns
- History of slavery in Louisiana
- French Louisianians
- Isleños
- Black Southerners
- Demographics of Louisiana
- List of African-American newspapers in Louisiana
- Iberia African American Historical Society
