= Emma Rice (disambiguation) =

Emma Rice (born 1967) is a British theatre director.

Emma Rice may also refer to:

- Emma Rice (winemaker), British winemaker
- Emma Rice (actress), British actress who starred in Cradle of Fear
- The married name of Emma Bridgewater who founded the British ceramics manufacturer Emma Bridgewater
