= Emma Wakefield-Paillet =

American physician

Emma Wakefield-Paillet (November 21, 1868 – August 26, 1946) was an American physician. Wakefield-Paillet was the first African-American woman to graduate from medical school and to practice medicine in Louisiana.

== Biography ==
Wakefield-Paillet was born on November 21, 1868, in New Iberia, Louisiana, the fourth child of Samuel Wakefield and his wife, Amelia Valentine Wakefield. Her father was a state senator from 1877 to 1879, and an older brother, Adolph J. Wakefield, served as Clerk of Court for Iberia Parish between 1884 and 1888. The family fled New Iberia not long after her younger brother was lynched and the family home was terrorized by a mob of angry white citizens. They settled in New Orleans.

Wakefield-Paillet graduated from Flint Medical College in 1879, becoming the first black woman to graduate from medical school in Louisiana. She earned her license from the Louisiana state medical board that same year. Later, she became the first African American woman in the state to work as a physician, when she opened her own medical practice in New Orleans by 1898. In 1900, she moved to San Francisco, where she was married to Joseph Oscar Paillet. She was licensed to practice medicine in California in 1901. She remained in California for the rest of her life, dying there in 1946.

A play about her life, The Forgotten Healer, by Ed Verdin, was performed in 2018. Also in 2018, a historical marker describing her significance was erected by historian Phebe Hayes and the Iberia African American Historical Society (IAAHS).
