= Phebe Hayes =

American historian

- Born: Phebe Archon Hayes; Louisiana, United States
- Occupations: Independent historian, speech pathologist, academic administrator, professor

Phebe Archon Hayes is an American independent historian, focused on the African American history of Iberia Parish, Louisiana. She previously worked as a speech pathologist, academic administrator, and professor. Hayes is the founder of the Iberia African American Historical Society (IAAHS). She worked in multiple roles (including as a dean) at the University of Louisiana at Lafayette (UL Lafayette) from 1986 until 2013.

== Biography ==
She worked the University of Louisiana at Lafayette (UL Lafayette) from 1986 until 2013, and was a part of the department of communication sciences and disorders faculty. She served as dean of the college of general studies at UL Lafayette, from 1998 to 2013.

In her period of retirement she was volunteering at the library, and found a book about notable physicians from the Iberia Parish from 1859 to 1959, but only White men were mention. She had memories of an oral history from her childhood about local African-American doctors, and she was inspired to research the missing history. In her research she found some twenty historical African American physicians from Iberia Parish, including Dr. Emma Wakefield-Paillet. She helped raise money to get a historic plaque installed in 2018, in honor of Wakefield-Paillet. Her work in researching Wakefield-Paillet was recognized, and she was a 2019 recipient of the Trailblazer Award by New Orleans magazine.

Hayes founded the Iberia African American Historical Society (IAAHS) in 2017, a 501(c)(3) nonprofit organization focused on African American history in Iberia Parish, Louisiana. Hayes and IAAHS have also partnered with the UL Lafayette's Center for Louisiana Studies as a repository of IAAHS historical and archival collection.
