= Edward Wakefield =

Edward Wakefield may refer to:

== Politics ==
- Edward Gibbon Wakefield (1796–1862), English statesman and colonial theorist
- Edward Wakefield (died 1602), MP for Kingston upon Hull
- Jerningham Wakefield (1820–1879), New Zealand politician and author, son of Edward Gibbon Wakefield
- Edward Wakefield (New Zealand politician) (1845–1924), New Zealand politician and journalist, grandson of Edward Wakefield (1774–1854)
- Sir Edward Wakefield, 1st Baronet (1903–1969), British civil servant and Conservative Party politician

== Other ==
- Edward Wakefield (statistician) (1774–1854), English philanthropist and statistician
- Edward Thomas Wakefield (1821–1896), English ironmaster
- Ned Wakefield, a fictional character in the Sweet Valley High book series
