= Emma Rice (winemaker) =

British Winemaker

Emma Rice is a British winemaker. Previously, during her role as head winemaker at Hattingley Valley, she became the first woman to win the UKVA Winemaker of the Year twice. She currently works as an independent consultant winemaker.

== Career ==
Rice "developed a fascination with fine wine" whilst working as a waitress in The White Horse Inn, Chilgrove as a teenager and decided she wanted to "make a living in the industry". After deciding not to go to university she got a job at Oddbins where she began to take WSET courses.

Whilst working as an editor for Mitchell Beazley on the "Pocket Wine Book" she discovered Plumpton College's winemaking courses and decided to enrole. She graduated Plumpton with a BSc in Viticulture and Oenology in 2006. She then spent time working at Cuvaison winery in Napa Valley and Tamar Ridge in Tasmania before moving back to the UK.

She joined Hattingley Valley in 2008 as head winemaker. Whilst working for Hattingley Valley she was awarded the UKVA Winemaker of the Year in 2014 and 2016. In 2020 the Hattingley Valley, Kings Cuvée 2014 won the WineGB Supreme Champion award. During Rice's time at Hattingley Valley, the wines won many awards at The Champagne and Sparkling Wine World Championships.

She left Hattingley Valley in 2022 and currently works as an independent consultant winemaker, releasing her first wines in 2024 (from the 2009 vintage).
