= John Doyle (director) =

Scottish stage director (born 1952)

- Born: 1952 (age 73–74); Inverness, Scotland
- Occupation: Theatre director

John Doyle (born 1952) is a Scottish theatre director of musicals and plays, as well as operas. He served as artistic director at several regional theatres in the United Kingdom, where he staged more than 200 professional productions during his career spanning over 40 years.

In 2005, he directed a Broadway revival of the musical Sweeney Todd: The Demon Barber of Fleet Street, in a minimalist production in which the cast served as its own orchestra, for which he won the Tony Award for Best Direction of a Musical. His 2006 Broadway revival of the musical Company won the Tony Award for Best Revival of a Musical.

From 2016 to 2022, he served as Artistic Director of the off-Broadway theater Classic Stage Company, located in the East Village in New York City.

== Early life and education ==
Doyle was born and raised in Inverness, Scotland. He trained at the Royal Conservatoire of Scotland and then the University of Georgia in the United States.

== Career ==
=== Early years ===
He was artistic director of four theatres in England, the Swan Theatre, Worcester (1982-1985), the Everyman in Cheltenham, the Everyman Theatre, Liverpool (1989-1993) and the Theatre Royal, York (1993-1997). Subsequently he was associate director of the Watermill Theatre, a 216-seat performance space in the English countryside of Berkshire until 2008.

In his work he has become known for his unusual approach to musical theatre, often featuring casts who are both actors and musicians, accompanying one another on musical instruments while simultaneously playing roles. This approach started with a 1992 staging of Candide at the Liverpool Everyman

=== Broadway ===
His 2004 staging of Stephen Sondheim's Sweeney Todd moved from the Watermill to the West End in 2005 (first to Trafalgar Studios and then the Ambassadors Theatre). In November 2005 he re-mounted Sweeney on Broadway, with Michael Cerveris playing the "demon barber" and Patti LuPone as Mrs. Lovett. For this production, he received the 2006 Tony Award for Best Direction of a Musical.

For Doyle's next project, he moved to the Cincinnati Playhouse in the Park to reinvent Sondheim's Company with a cast led by Raúl Esparza, again with actors who sing, dance and provide their own musical accompaniment (known in England as actor/muso). This production was then produced on Broadway at the Ethel Barrymore Theatre in 2006 and won the Tony Award, Drama Desk Award, Outer Critics Circle Award and Drama League Award for Best Revival of a Musical. Doyle also staged an actor/musician version of Mack and Mabel starring David Soul and Janie Dee in the West End. For his last production at Watermill, he directed Merrily We Roll Along in March 2008. In June through August 2009 he directed a production of Oklahoma! at the Chichester Festival Theatre, with fresh orchestrations by Jonathan Tunick. The piece was dark in its conception and was well received. The Guardian reviewer noted "Doyle's spare approach renders this as a bittersweet, almost Chekhovian experience exploring the nature of identity, the loss of innocence and a society on the brink of change."

He directed the musical A Catered Affair, which ran on Broadway from April 17 through July 27, 2008 at the Walter Kerr Theatre. Also in 2008, Doyle directed the Sondheim/John Weidman musical Road Show Off-Broadway at The Public Theater; the musical ran from October 28 through December 28, 2008.

Doyle directed a production of Kiss Me, Kate at the Stratford Shakespeare Festival for their 2010 season. He also has ventured into the world of opera, directing a production of Kurt Weill's Rise and Fall of the City of Mahagonny in Los Angeles in 2007; of Benjamin Britten's Peter Grimes at the Metropolitan Opera in 2008; and of Gaetano Donizetti's Lucia di Lammermoor for Houston Grand Opera in the 2010-11 season.

Doyle directed the Encores! Sondheim and Wynton Marsalis staged concert A Bed and A Chair at City Center, New York City, from November 13 through 17, 2013. The concert featured Bernadette Peters, Norm Lewis, Jeremy Jordan, Cyrille Aimée, and Elizabeth Parkinson.

In 2014, Doyle directed a production of The Visit with actress Chita Rivera at the Williamstown Theatre Festival. It moved to Broadway in 2015.

Doyle received his third Tony nomination for his direction of the revival of The Color Purple starring Cynthia Erivo, Danielle Brooks and Jennifer Hudson. The revival was first staged at The Menier Chocolate Factory in London in 2013 before transferring to Broadway in November 2015. The Broadway production won the Tony awards for Best Revival of a Musical and Best Actress in a Musical for Erivo's performance as Celie.
