= John Wakefield =

John Wakefield may refer to:

- John Wakefield (banker) (1738–1811), English Quaker merchant and financier
- John Allen Wakefield (1797–1873), American historian, politician, soldier, physician, and lawyer
- John Wakefield (civil servant), former Director of Agriculture in Tanganyika; see Tanganyika groundnut scheme
- John Wakefield (footballer), British footballer who competed at the 1960 Summer Olympics football tournament
- John Wakefield, councillor and Mayor of Waverley Council
- John Wakefield, a character in the horror mystery miniseries Harper's Island
