= Sam Walters (director) =

British theatre director (born 1939)

Sam Walters MBE
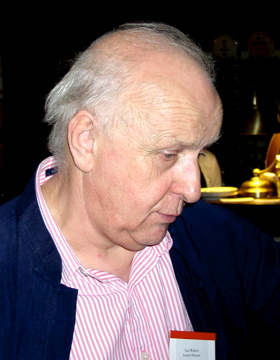
- Walters, 27 August 2009
- Born: 1939
- Education: Merton College, Oxford
- Spouse: Auriol Smith (m. 1964)
- Children: 2

Sam Walters MBE (born 11 October 1939) is a British theatre director who retired in 2014 as artistic director of the Orange Tree Theatre in Richmond, London. He has also directed in the West End and at Ipswich, Canterbury and Greenwich, as well as at LAMDA, RADA and Webber Douglas. After 42 years Walters, the United Kingdom's longest-serving artistic director, and his wife and associate director, Auriol Smith, stepped down from their posts at the Orange Tree Theatre in June 2014.

== Career ==
=== Early years ===
Sam Walters was educated at Felsted School and while there, in 1957, he won the Public Schools Debating Association public speaking competition. He also captained the Essex Young Amateurs cricket team. He then took a degree at Merton College, Oxford (1959–62), where he was president of the Experimental Theatre Club. He trained as an actor at LAMDA (1962–64) turning to directing with the formation of the Worcester Repertory Company in 1967.

=== The Orange Tree Theatre ===
He was invited to establish Jamaica's first full-time theatre company and drama school, and on his return to England in 1971 he founded the Orange Tree Theatre, first in a room above the Orange Tree pub and then in a purpose-built theatre, in a converted former school. The Orange Tree was London's first purpose-built theatre in the round.

"When we started the Orange Tree Theatre in 1971, we only wanted to put on plays. There was no political or social aim, nor did we philosophise about theatre-in-the-round or a style of minimal theatre. There was no money for stage lights or a raised stage, so we performed by daylight on the same floor level as the seating. And we discovered the excitement of making the audience part of the action." (Sam Walters in conversation with Marsha Hanlon for the Orange Tree Theatre appeal brochure in 1991).

Walters won a Time Out Award for his 1987–88 season in the old theatre, being described as a "theatrical totter", and in 1989 was awarded a Winston Churchill Travelling Fellowship, part of which he spent in Prague during the Velvet Revolution, and part in Moscow and Leningrad.

In 1991, he received the Charrington Fringe Award for Outstanding Achievement in Small Theatre, which was followed by the Empty Space Peter Brook award for the work of the 1992–93 company season.

In 1993–94, he took a year away from the Orange Tree, taught in America and visited all fellow theatres-in-the-round. In 2012, he received an Offie Special Achievement Award. In 2009, he received an Honorary Doctor of Letters by Kingston University. In 2013 he received a Peter Brook Special Achievement Award.

== Honours ==
Walters was bestowed the honour of Order of the British Empire, with the rank of Member, by Elizabeth II in her 1999 New Year Honours. He and his wife Auriol Smith received the Freedom of the London Borough of Richmond upon Thames in December 2014.

== Productions ==
Sam Walters' productions at the Orange Tree Theatre include:

=== Old Orange Tree Theatre ===
- Go Tell It on Table Mountain (Evan Jones), the Orange Tree's opening production on 31 December 1971
- Games and After Liverpool (James Saunders) 1972
- George Reborn (David Cregan) 1973
- The Borage Pigeon Affair (James Saunders) 1973
- Bye Bye Blues (James Saunders) 1973
- Transcending (David Cregan)
- Next Time I'll Sing to You (James Saunders) 1974
- Tina (David Cregan) 1975
- Transcending (David Cregan), February 1976
- The Memorandum (Václav Havel), February 1977
- Bodies (James Saunders), April 1977
- Find Me (Olwen Wymark) 1977
- Cast Off (David Cregan) 1978)
- Mr Director (Fay Weldon) 1978
- Family Circles (Alan Ayckbourn), November 1978
- The Caucasian Chalk Circle (Bertolt Brecht), January 1979
- Doctor Knock (Jules Romains/Harley Granville Barker), March 1979
- The Primary English Class (Israel Horovitz), November 1979
- The Way of the World (Congreve), February 1980
- The Happy Haven (John Arden), March 1980
- Uncle Vanya (Chekhov), February 1981
- Best Friends (Olwen Wymark), March 1981
- Fall (James Saunders), November 1981
- King Lear (Shakespeare,) January 1982
- Winter (David Mowat), September 1983
- Nothing to Declare (James Saunders), November 1983
- The Man of Mode (Etherege), January 1984
- The Power of Darkness (Tolstoy/Anthony Clark), March 1984
- Four Attempted Acts (Martin Crimp), 1984
- The Dark River (Rodney Ackland), September 1984
- Hard Times (Charles Dickens/Stephen Jeffreys), November 1984
- Hamlet: First Quarto version (Shakespeare), March 1985
- Revisiting the Alchemist (Charles Jennings), October 1985
- A Variety of Death-Defying Acts (Martin Crimp), December 1985
- A Journey to London (Vanbrugh/James Saunders), January 1986
- Sauce for the Goose (Le Dindon, Georges Feydeau,) February 1986
- Mother Courage and Her Children (Bertolt Brecht), October 1986
- Hans Kohlhaas (Heinrich von Kleist/James Saunders), November 1986
- Largo Desolato (Václav Havel/Tom Stoppard), February 1987
- A Smile on the End of the Line (Michel Vinaver), March 1987
- No More A-Roving (John Whiting), October 1987
- Love's a Luxury (farce Guy Paxton and Edward V Hoile), December 1987
- The Secret Life (Harley Granville Barker), January 1988
- Absolute Hell (Rodney Ackland), March 1988
- The Way to Keep Him (Arthur Murphy), September 1988
- Dealing with Clair (Martin Crimp), October 1988
- Situation Vacant (Michel Vinaver), March 1989
- Le Bourgeois Gentilhomme (Molière), April 1989
- Play with Repeats (Martin Crimp), October 1989
- We, the Undersigned (Alexander Gelman), November 1989
- Redevelopment (Václav Havel), September 1990

=== New Orange Tree Theatre ===
- All in the Wrong (Arthur Murphy), opening production in the new theatre, February 1991
- Nutmeg and Ginger (Julian Slade), June 1991
- Little Eyolf (Henrik Ibsen), October 1991
- Cerceau (Viktor Slavkin), Walters as a performer only, May 1992
- Dark River revival (Rodney Ackland), March 1992
- His Majesty (Harley Granville Barker) also Edinburgh Festival, September 1992
- The Dutch Courtesan (John Marston) October 1992
- A Penny for a Song (John Whiting), December 1992
- The Artifice (Susannah Centlivre), February 1993
- Nice Dorothy (David Cregan), May 1993
- A Penny for a Song (John Whiting) revival, July 1993
- Doctor Knock (Jules Romains) revival, October 1994
- Flora the Red Menace (Kander and Ebb), December 1994
- Portrait of a Woman (Michael Vinaver, translated by Donald Watson), February 1995
- The Memorandum (Václav Havel), March 1995
- Retreat (James Saunders), May 1995
- Flora the Red Menace (Kander and Ebb) revival, August 1995
- The Maitlands (Ronald Mackenzie), October 1995
- The Simpleton of the Unexpected Isles (George Bernard Shaw), December 1995
- The Good Woman of Setzuan (Bertolt Brecht), February 1996
- The Power of the Dog (Ellen Dryden), May 1996
- What the Heart Feels (Stephen Bill), October 1996
- Family Circles (Alan Ayckbourn), December 1996
- Inheritors (Susan Glaspell), February 1997
- Family Circles (Alan Ayckbourn), August 1997
- Overboard (Michel Vinaver), October 1997
- All in the Wrong (Arthur Murphy), revival December 1997
- Macbeth (Shakespeare), February 1998
- Sperm Wars (David Lewis), September 1998
- Court in the Act (farce Hennequin and Veber), December 1998
- The Way of the World (Congreve), March 1999
- The Last Thrash (David Cregan), Walters as a performer only, April 1999
- Winner Takes All (farce La main passe Feydau), January 2000
- Hurting (David Lewis), March 2000
- Arms and the Man (George Bernard Shaw), September 2000
- The Daughter-in-Law (D. H. Lawrence), February 2001
- Clockwatching (Torben Betts), March 2001
- Whispers Along the Patio (David Cregan) October 2001, also Stephen Joseph Theatre, Scarborough
- The Caucasian Chalk Circle (Bertolt Brecht, with a new Prologue by James Saunders), November 2001
- Have You Anything to Declare? (farce Hennequin and Veber), December 2001
- Three Sisters (Chekhov, translated by Carol Rocamora as The Three Sisters), February 2002
- Happy Birthday Dear Alice (Bernard Farrell), April 2002
- The Road to Ruin (Thomas Holcroft), September 2002
- Saints Day (John Whiting), October 2002
- The Game Hunter(Monsieur Chasse farce, Feydeau, translated by Richard Cottrell), April 2003
- The Mob (John Galsworthy), September 2003
- King Cromwell (Oliver Ford Davies), November 2003
- Love's a Luxury (farce by Guy Paxton and Edward V Hoile), April 2004
- The Marrying of Ann Leete (Harvey Granville Barker), September 2004
- Myth, Propaganda & Disaster in Nazi Germany & Contemporary America (Stephen Sewell), November 2004
- Monkey's Uncle (David Lewis), October 2005
- A Journey to London (Vanbrugh, completed by James Saunders), December 2005
- The Madras House (Harley Granville Barker), September 2006
- Major Barbara (George Bernard Shaw), October 2006
- The Skin Game (John Galsworthy), March 2007
- The Woman Hater (Fanny Burney); December 2007
- Leaving (Václav Havel), English language premiere, September 2008
- Greenwash (David Lewis), February 2009
- Factors Unforeseen (Michel Vinaver, translated by Catherine Crimp), May 2009
- The Making of Moo (Nigel Dennis), November 2009
- The Lady or the Tiger (Michael Richmond and Jeremy Paul, score by Nola York), January 2010
- Once Bitten (farce by Alfred Hennequin and Alfred Dellacourt, translated and adapted by Reggie Oliver), January 2011
- Reading Hebron (Jason Sherman), February 2011
- The Conspirators (Václav Havel), August 2011
- Muswell Hill (Torben Betts), February 2012
- Yours for the Asking (Ana Diosdado), September 2012
- Sauce for the Goose (Georges Feydeau), December 2012
- The Stepmother (Githa Sowerby), February 2013
- Springs Eternal (Susan Glaspell), September 2013

== Personal life ==
Sam Walters is married to actress-director Auriol Smith, whom he met while doing pantomime at Rotherham in 1962. They have two daughters: Dorcas Walters, who was principal dancer with Birmingham Royal Ballet and now works in arts administration, and Octavia Walters, formerly an actress, now a sports injury masseur.

== Sources ==
- Who's Who in the Theatre, 17th edition, Volume 2: Playbills, ed Ian Herbert, Gale (1981) ISBN 0-8103-0236-5
- Theatre Record and its annual Indexes
- Orange Tree Theatre appeals brochure 1991
- Sam Walters' CVs in Orange Tree programmes
