= Auriol Smith =

British actress and theatre director

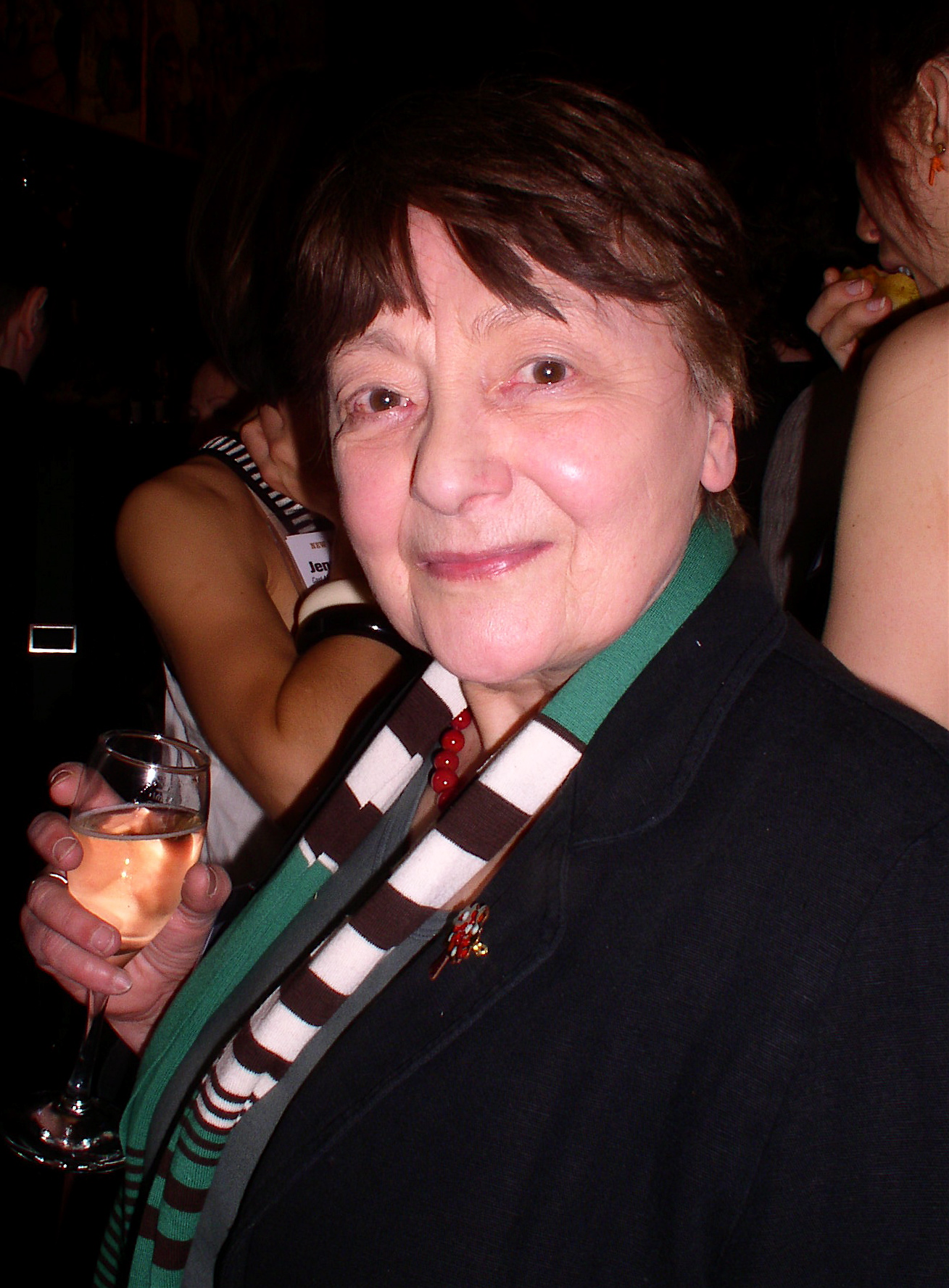
- Auriol Smith in 2010
- Born: 1936 (age 89–90)
- Spouse(s): Sam Walters; 1964 to date (two daughters)

Auriol Smith (born 1936) is an English actress and theatre director. She was a founder member and associate director of the Orange Tree Theatre in Richmond, London. She co-founded the theatre in 1971 with her husband Sam Walters, who became the United Kingdom's longest-serving artistic director. Walters and Smith stepped down from their posts at the Orange Tree Theatre in June 2014.

== Early years ==
Whilst taking a degree in drama at Bristol University she became President of the Green Room Society at the newly founded university Drama Department. This was followed by a year in America as a Fulbright Scholar, before making her professional debut at the Hampstead Theatre Club in January 1960 in Harold Pinter's first play The Room (which she had originally played in a converted squash-court for the Bristol Drama Department in May 1957).

== Orange Tree Theatre ==
After extensive experience in repertory theatres and a year in Jamaica setting up a drama school and theatre, she and her husband Sam Walters co-founded the Orange Tree Theatre in Richmond, London in 1971, where she played many classic and modern parts. "We enjoyed doing small-scale productions in Jamaica, and hoped that eventually we'd run that kind of theatre in England. Then, when we returned in 1971, we decided that now was the time and Richmond (where we lived) was the place." (Auriol Smith in conversation with Marsha Hanlon for the Orange Tree Appeal brochure, 1991).

=== Performances ===
In the old theatre:

- Penelope in A Slight Accident (James Saunders) Lunchtimes, January 1976
- Find Me (Olwen Wymark) 1977
- Teacher in The Primary English Class (Israel Horovitz) November 1979
- Woman in Living Remains (Martin Crimp) Lunchtimes, 9–25 July 1982

The new theatre opened in February 1991. Her Orange Tree performance credits there included:

- Countess Czernyak in His Majesty (Harley Granville Barker) 1992 – also Edinburgh International Festival
- Mary Faugh in The Dutch Courtesan (John Marston) 1992
- Hester Bellboys in Penny For a Song (John Whiting) 1992
- Dorothy in Nice Dorothy (David Cregan) 1993
- Mariette in Doctor Knock (Jules Romains) 1994
- Emma in Family Circles (Alan Ayckbourn) 1996 and 1997
- Mme Lepine in Overboard (Michael Vinaver) part of a French season in 1997
- Aglae in Court in the Act (farce Maurice Hennequin and Pierre Veber) 1998
- Lady Wishfort in The Way of the World (Congreve) 1999
- Mme Dupont in Have You Anything to Declare? (farce Hennequin and Veber) 2001
- Widow Warren in The Road to Ruin (Thomas Holcroft) 2002
- Helena in Previous Convictions (Alan Franks) 2005
- Lady Smatter in The Woman Hater (Fanny Burney) 2007
- Grandma, Rieger's mother in Leaving (Václav Havel) 200)

=== Directing ===
From 1991 to 2014 she also regularly directed at the Orange Tree. Her credits included:

- Cat With Green Violin (Jane Coles) 1991
- The Case of Rebellious Susan (Henry Arthur Jones) 1994: Time Out Award 1994
- The Verge (Susan Glaspell) 1996
- Love Me Slender (Vanessa Brooks) 1997
- Dissident, Goes Without Saying (Michael Vinaver) 1997
- Lips Together, Teeth Apart (Terrence McNally) 1998 and 1999
- The Cassilis Engagement (St John Hankin) 1999
- The Captain's Tiger (Athol Fugard) 2000
- Flyin' West (Pearl Cleage) 2001
- Three Sisters Two (Reza de Wet) 2002
- The House of Bernarda Alba (Federico García Lorca) 2003
- Simplicity (Lady Mary Wortley Montagu after Pierre Marivaux) 2003
- Doña Rosita the Spinster (Lorca) 2004
- The Women of Lockerbie (Deborah Brevoort) 2005
- Tosca's Kiss (Kenneth Jupp) 2006
- Nan (John Masefield) 2007
- Chains (Elizabeth Baker) 2007
- Mary Goes First (Henry Arthur Jones) 2008
- The Ring of Truth (Wynyard Browne) 2009
- Mary Broome (Allan Monkhouse) March 2011

== Other acting and directing work ==
During 1990, as part of a busy year, she played Lady Wishfort in The Way of the World at the Royal Exchange Manchester (deputising for Sylvia Syms who was indisposed), and toured North America for the ACTER company in The Winter's Tale playing opposite Paul Shelley as Leontes. She also appeared in Christine Edzard's film The Fool.

In the West End for producer Bill Kenwright, Smith directed Dead Guilty by Richard Harris (Apollo 1995) starring Hayley Mills and Jenny Seagrove; and Michael Redgrave's The Aspern Papers (Wyndham's 1996) with Hannah Gordon. She also directed a Japanese version of Dead Guilty in Japan.

At the Theatre Royal Windsor directed Shadow of a Doubt and Canaries Sometimes Sing. At the Northampton Theatre Royal she directed Arthur Miller's Broken Glass, David Mamet's Oleanna and James Robson's Mail Order Bride; while at the Stephen Joseph Theatre in Scarborough she first directed Love Me Slender.

== Television and audio ==
She worked extensively on radio including Pinter's 1960 radio version of his sixty-minute play The Room for the BBC Third Programme. For ten years she presented Listen with Mother on BBC Radio 4 and was a long-serving member of the Radio Drama Company. Her BBC radio credits include Alan Bennett's Forty Years On, the role of a tipsy summer partygoer in Ellen Dryden's romantic comedy Forgetting Rosalind (a FirstWrites production for the BBC), and East of the Sun by Carey Harrison.

For Naxos, Smith recorded the roles of Alice in Henry V with Samuel West, and the Duchess of York in Richard III with Kenneth Branagh. She has also acted on television in Kavanagh QC, One Foot in the Grave, Peak Practice and Doctors, among others.

== Honours ==
She and her husband Sam Walters received the Freedom of the London Borough of Richmond upon Thames in December 2014.

== Private life ==
Auriol Smith is the wife of Orange Tree co-founder and former artistic director Sam Walters, whom she met while doing pantomime at Rotherham in 1962. They have two daughters: Dorcas Walters, who was principal dancer with Birmingham Royal Ballet and is now a gyrotonic instructor, and Octavia Walters, formerly an actress and now a sports injury masseur and hypnotherapist.

== Sources ==
- Auriol Smith's Orange Tree Theatre programme CVs, 1991 and 2007
- Michael Billington (1996) The Life and Work of Harold Pinter. Faber ISBN 0-571-17103-6
- Theatre Record and its annual Indexes
