= Iberia African American Historical Society =

US nonprofit organization

Iberia African American Historical Society (IAAHS), located in Iberia Parish, Louisiana, is a 501(c)(3) nonprofit organization that researches, preserves, and educates about the history of African Americans in Iberia Parish.

IAAHS was founded in 2017 by Phebe Hayes, a retired professor and college dean, after Hayes found that Iberia's Black doctors were excluded from books about local doctors. In 2018, it became a 501(c)(3) organization. In 2022, IAAHS opened a Center for Research and Learning within Shadows-on-the-Teche, a former sugar plantation owned by the National Trust for Historic Preservation.

== See also ==
- African Americans in Louisiana
- List of historical societies in Louisiana
