= Charles Wakefield (numismatist) =

British numismatist and museum curator

- Born: 1834; York, Yorkshire, England
- Died: 1919 (aged 84–85)
- Occupations: Artist, teacher, and curator

Charles Wakefield (1834–1919) was a British artist, teacher, and museum curator.

== Early life and education ==
Charles Wakefield was born in York, England in 1934.

He was privately educated, eventually attending the York School of Art.

== Career ==
Wakefield was appointed drawing master at Elmfield College in 1864, whilst holding the same post at Bootham School.

In December 1870, following the reservation of William Dallas from the post, Wakefield was temporarily appointed to the post of Keeper of the Yorkshire Museum – a position he retained until 1878 when a permanent Keeper, John-Clay Purves was appointed.

Wakefield also served as the first honorary curator of numismatics at the museum from 1907, and served as vice-president of the Yorkshire Philosophical Society. Wakefield bequeathed £50,000 to the York Blind School and his home, Heslington House, to the York Corporation on his death.

== Death and legacy ==
Following his death in 1919, Wakefield's collection of coins was partially purchased by the Yorkshire Museum.
