= Richard Digby Day =

British Theatre Director

Richard Digby Day FRSA (born 27 December 1938) is a British stage director and international professor and lecturer. He is well known for his work in the classical theatre, in particular the plays of William Shakespeare and George Bernard Shaw. He is a vice president of the Shaw Society, a Fellow of the Royal Society of Arts, and has staged more productions of Shaw's work than any other living director. His productions of Stephen Sondheim musicals have also been notable.

== Early life and career ==
Digby Day was born in Cardiff, the son of Donald Day and Doris Mary (née George). He attended Rhiwbeina Junior School in Cardiff, before relocating with his family to the Midlands in 1952, where his education continued at Solihull School, Warwickshire. He went on to win the Leverhulme Scholarship to study at the Royal Academy of Dramatic Art, becoming their first student of direction. He graduated in 1963. Prior to attending RADA, he appeared as an actor in the role of Swiss Cheese in the Midlands premiere of Brecht's Mother Courage in Stratford-upon-Avon, 1961. He is a contemporary of British actor Ian McKellen, and the two began their professional careers working on many of the same productions with Digby Day serving as assistant director.

== Artistic directorships ==
Digby Day has been Artistic Director of five UK theatres: the Bournemouth Theatre Company (from 1966 to 1968); the New Shakespeare Company at the Open Air Theatre in Regent's Park (from 1966 to 1974); the Welsh National Theatre Company (from 1969 to 1971); the York Theatre Royal (from 1971 to 1976); the Nottingham Playhouse (from 1980 to 1984); and the Northcott Theatre, (from 1977 to 1980).

Additionally, his work has been seen in the West End and on tour extensively throughout the UK, Canada, Denmark, and Ireland. Particularly successful were his touring productions of Sondheim's A Little Night Music and Company, Shaw's The Devil's Disciple, Somerset Maugham's Our Betters, and J M Barrie's Peter Pan. He directed Geraldine McEwan at the National Theatre in Two Inches of Ivory, a production about Jane Austen that has been seen all over the world under the auspices of the British Council, the UK's official international organisation for educational opportunities and cultural relations.

== Career as a professor ==
Richard Digby Day has taught and lectured in the UK and in North America. From 2003 to 2012 he was Director of the London Dramatic Academy of Fordham University. He had previously served on the faculty at the Royal Academy of Dramatic Art, as well as the London Academy of Music and Dramatic Art, the National Theatre School of Canada, and the graduate program of Columbia University where he directed the Shakespeare Project for two years.

From 1998–2002, he was Principal of the London Academy of Theatre, a classical theatre program for American students in the UK. From 1990 to 1998, he was director of the National Theater Institute at the Eugene O'Neill Theater Center in Waterford, CT. During this period, he served on the Regional Committee of the Arts Council of Great Britain, on the National Council for Drama Training, was Chairman of the Drama Panel of the Yorkshire Arts Association, and taught regularly at colleges and universities in the United States. He also served on the board of the Drama League of New York and helped found their Directors Project. In 1997 he was named Adjunct Professor of Theater at Connecticut College where he had worked since 1984.

He is credited with discovering actors Ralph Fiennes and Hugh Grant.
