= Peter of Wakefield =

Peter of Wakefield or Peter of Pontefract (died 1213) was an English hermit executed by King John for prophesying that John's crown would be passed to another.

Peter was a simple illiterate man, living a lonely ascetic life at Wakefield. In the latter part of 1212 — perhaps on his northern journey that year — King John was told that a Wakefield hermit had prophesied that evil would befall him. Summoning him to his presence, John inquired concerning the prophecy, and was told that by next Ascension Day, 23 May 1213, his crown would have been transferred to another. John committed the prophet to William of Harcourt to be kept in custody at Corfe Castle until the truth of his words should be proved. The prophecy, which is said to have spread even to France, was widely believed, or at least feared, and John himself, as the day approached, was evidently nervous. Matthew Paris goes so far as to assert that this fear hastened John's submission to Pandulf, which was completed by the act of homage on the eve of Ascension day 1213. When the dreaded day was safely over, John, in spite of Peter's protest that his prophecy had been fulfilled, and that John's crown had indeed passed to another, took cruel vengeance. He ordered Peter to be dragged by horses to Wareham and there hanged with his son.

The story illustrates the feeling of the English people in regard to the meaning of John's act of submission to the pope. The chroniclers are fairly unanimous in declaring that Peter's famous prophecy had indeed been fulfilled, though in a sense other than had been expected.
