= Samuel Wakefield =

American politician (c. 1834–1883)

Member of the Louisiana Senate, for District 22
- In office 1877–1879
- Other names: Samuel Wakefield Sr.

Personal details
- Born: c. 1834 – c. 1835 St. Martin Parish, Louisiana, United States
- Died: February 1, 1889 New Iberia, Iberia Parish, Louisiana, United States
- Spouse: Amelia Valentine
- Children: 7, including Emma Wakefield-Paillet
- Occupation: Postmaster, tax collector, cooper, school official, politician, state legislator

Samuel Wakefield (c. 1834–1883), was an American postmaster, tax collector, school official, and state legislator in Louisiana. During the Reconstruction era, he represented Iberia Parish in the Louisiana Senate.

== Biography ==
Samuel Wakefield was born c. 1834, in St. Martin Parish, Louisiana. He was documented as being mulatto, literate, and having worked as a cooper and tax collector. In 1874, he served as the tax collector, elected by the Republicans.

He founded the Wakefield Institute (?–1874) in New Iberia, Louisiana, a two story private school for African American students, during the time of racial segregation. The school was destroyed by a tornado in 1874.

Wakefield represented Iberia Parish in the Louisiana Senate, from 1877 to 1879. He was deposed from office during the term of governor Francis T. Nicholls, and his seat was passed to George Wailles.

He was married to Amelia Valentine, and they had seven children. In 1879, his daughter Emma Wakefield-Paillet was the first black woman to qualify as a physician in Louisiana. An older child, Adolph J. Wakefield, served as Clerk of Court for Iberia Parish, between 1884 and 1888; and the first African American to do so.

A younger son, also named Samuel Wakefield Jr., was in an altercation in January 1889 with a white man named James W. Trainor who owned the door, curtain, and blinds shop. There are conflicting stories about the event that transpired, one version is that Trainor had forced Wakefield Jr., then age 17, to carry a heavy new door down a flight of stairs for Wakefield Jr. employer, however when he resisted Wakefield Jr. was stabbed. Another version of the story is that Wakefield Jr. was employed by Trainor, and was slapped or punched when he wouldn't do his job. Trainor was murdered by gunshot, apparently inflicted by the junior Wakefield. Following the event, the Wakefield family home was terrorized by a mob of angry white citizens. On January 25, 1889, Samuel Wakefield Jr. was attacked and lynched by a mob while in the jail at New Iberia.

Samuel Wakefield Sr. committed suicide by firearm days later on February 1, 1889, in New Iberia. The family fled not long after, and settled in New Orleans.

== See also ==
- African American officeholders from the end of the Civil War until before 1900
