= Waltham Forest Festival of Theatre =

Coordinates: 51.631°N 0.003°E

Waltham Forest Festival of Theatre is an amateur drama festival of one act plays that takes place each year in the London Borough of Waltham Forest. It is the only amateur theatre festival in East London. The patron of the festival is actor Derek Jacobi.

Waltham Forest Festival of Theatre serves as a first round festival in the Eastern District of the All England Theatre Festival (the AETF), and is affiliated to the National Drama Festivals Association (NDFA). The winners of the Waltham Forest Festival of Theatre may be invited to perform at the NDFA British All Winners Festival that takes place each year in July.

Each year the Waltham Forest Festival of Theatre has entries from adult amateur drama groups, amateur theatre companies, youth theatre clubs and school and college drama clubs and classes. The Festival is organised into both adult and youth sections and each competing team presents a one-act play. Two or three one-act plays are performed at each evening or matinee session of the Festival. The Festival takes place across a week, so often there are between 15 and 18 different theatre companies performing a play on stage during the week of the Festival.

Festival rules state that plays must be more than 20 minutes and no more than 55 minutes long to be performed at the Festival and there must be more than one speaking part in any play.

A professional adjudicator from the Guild of Drama Adjudicators sits in the audience and judges each play on its merits. The Adjudicator takes to the stage at the end of the session and comments on each play, the acting, its staging, costumes, lighting and set. The Adjudicator's marks are added up on the final night to decide who has won the Festival. The winning team is then eligible to enter succeeding rounds of the knockout competition, which culminates in the All-England Final in June and the British Final in July.

There are also awards for best actor, best actress, best performer under 18 years of age, best new writing, best comedy.

== History ==
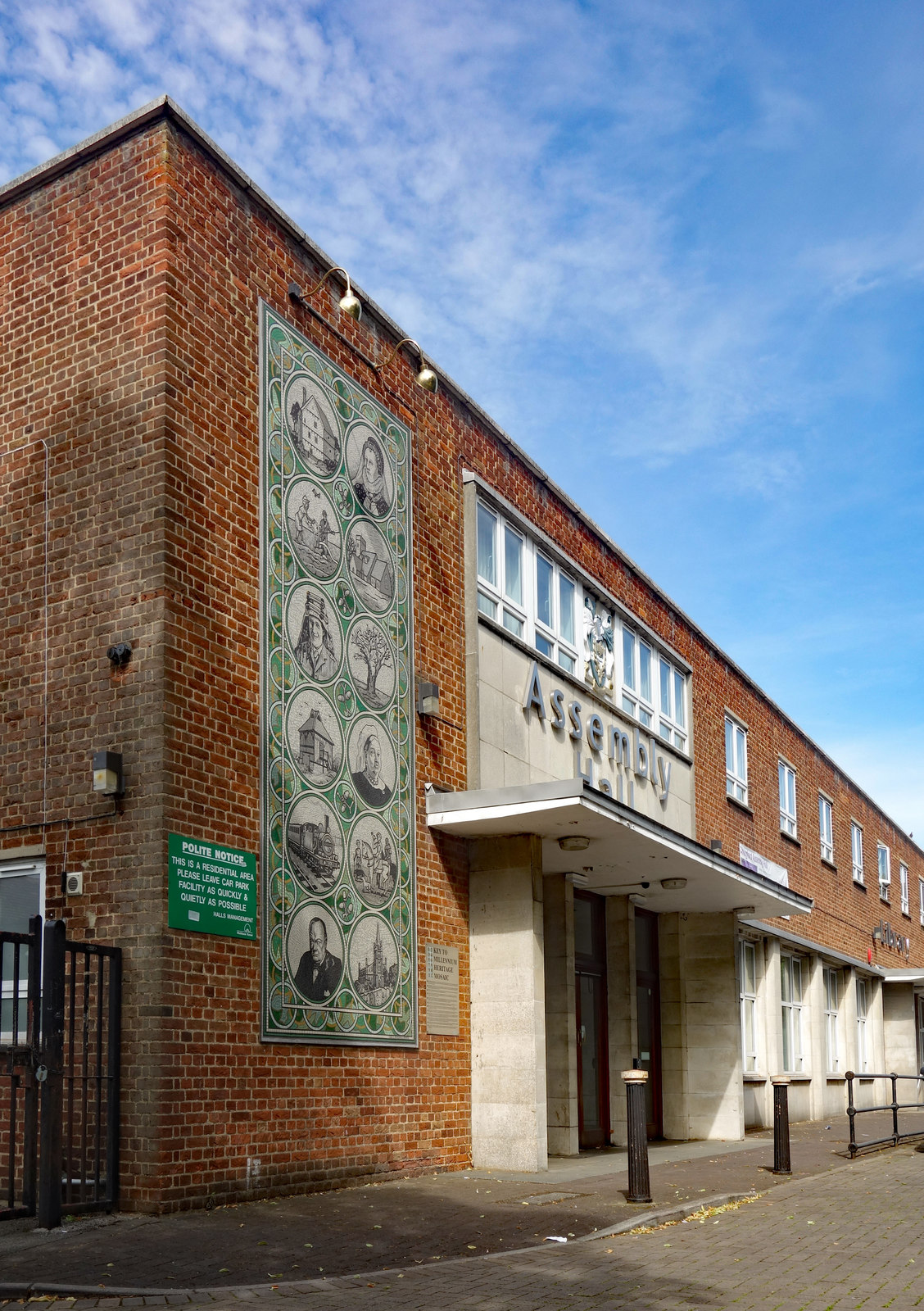
Chingford Assembly Hall

The Waltham Forest Festival of Theatre began in 1981 as the Waltham Forest Drama Festival. The name Waltham Forest Festival of Theatre was adopted in 2006.

The original venue that the Festival was normally held in - the Waltham Forest Theatre in Lloyd Park, Walthamstow - was demolished in 2011, and the Festival's current regular venue is Chingford Assembly Hall.
