= Peggy Batchelor =

British actress, drama teacher and adjudicator (1916–2020)

- Born: Peggy Joyce Batchelor; 26 November 1916; Wembley, London, England
- Died: 18 July 2020 (aged 103); Leicester, England
- Occupations: Actress, drama teacher and adjudicator
- Known for: The Waiting Room; My Hero; Blackout

Peggy Batchelor (26 November 1916 – 18 July 2020) was a British actress, drama teacher and adjudicator.

== Career ==
Born to parents who were entertainers, Batchelor's first major public performance was at the age of eight as "Baby Peggy", dancing the troops across the stadium each night for the ten weeks of the Wembley Tattoo at the British Empire Exhibition in 1925. She shared her memories of this in a radio broadcast on the BBC Home Service in 1946, Scrapbook for 1925.

In the late 1930s, Batchelor worked as a school teacher and studied at the Guildhall School of Music and Drama. During World War II, she joined the Entertainments National Service Association (ENSA). She performed for troops in the UK, West Africa, Egypt and India.

In 1946, Batchelor became a founding member of The West of England Theatre Company. Her roles included Alice Foster in J. B. Priestley's They Came to a City, Fan in Emlyn Williams' The Light of Heart, Ruth in Noël Coward's Blithe Spirit, Sarah the old nurse in Priestley's Eden End, Sally Pratt in Priestley's I Have Been Here Before, and Donna Lucia d'Alvadorez in Charley's Aunt. Batchelor was popular with audiences; one reviewer wrote, "For her characterisation of a Northcountry maid in the West of England Theatre Company's presentation of J. B. Priestley's "Eden End," Peggy Batchelor received well-deserved recognition from an even larger than usual audience at the New Hall, Tiverton, on Tuesday. Miss Batchelor had obviously spared no pains to get well under the skin of her part of forthright but kind-hearted family servant the pre-1914-18 war era, and her attention to detail in the matter of accent was just one of the things which gave her performance that audience appeal which comes from really good acting." Another reviewer wrote of her role in A.A. Milne's The Dover Road that she was the "[o]utstanding performer in a capable cast".

Appearances on television and radio followed including Gilbert and Sullivan, Mrs Dale's Diary, Dick Barton, The Adventures of P.C. 49 and Cabaret with a young Benny Hill. Batchelor voiced the Kingmaker in the 2001–2002 Doctor Who audio drama Death Comes to Time. She remains the longest-lived female person associated with Doctor Who and the second longest lived overall (behind Arnold Yarrow).

== Teaching ==
Batchelor obtained a teacher's degree at the Guildhall. In 1955, she founded The Ridley Studios in Leigh-on-Sea, named after her Guildhall Professor, Frank Ridley; Dame Sybil Thorndike was a patron. Batchelor continued to direct the Ridley Studios until shortly before moving to Buckinghamshire and marrying in 1984. Batchelor also had a close relationship with the Palace Theatre, Westcliff-on-Sea, directing and appearing in plays herself, and providing students of the Ridley Studios for child and teenage roles in performances there. She was a member of the Guild of Drama Adjudicators and a founder member of the National Drama Festivals Association. As an adjudicator and teacher, Batchelor travelled to music and drama festivals around England, Wales and Northern Ireland. The chairman of one county drama association considered her "a lady of national repute which makes her views of the work offered a valuable contribution to raising the standards." In 1973, she was made a Fellow of the Guildhall School of Music; she was also a Fellow of the Royal Society of Arts and of the Victoria College of Music and Drama, and vice-chairman of the Society of Teachers of Speech and Drama.

== Personal life and death ==
Whilst in Lahore, India, Batchelor met RAF Squadron Leader Air Commodore Arthur Clegg on 1 September 1944 after one of her performances. They met again many years later when he was living in Wendover and married on 1 September 1984, the fortieth anniversary of their first meeting. After ten years, Arthur died and Peggy returned to acting in theatre and TV. Becoming too frail to look after herself, she moved closer to be near family. She died in Leicester, England on 18 July 2020 aged 103.

== Filmography ==
=== Film ===
Year	Title	Role	Notes
2007	The Waiting Room	Doris	
2008	Blackout	Allison	

=== Television ===
Year	Title	Role	Notes
2005	My Hero	Mrs. Raven	Episode: "Night Fever"
2005	The Queen's Sister	Mile End Flat Woman	TV film
2006	Holby City	Yvonne Perry	Episode: "If the Heart Lies"

=== Audio ===
Year	Title	Role	Notes
2001–2002	Doctor Who: Death Comes to Time	The Kingmaker	Also a webcast

== See also ==
- List of centenarians (actors, filmmakers and entertainers)
