= Amateur theatre =

Theatre performed by amateur actors and singers

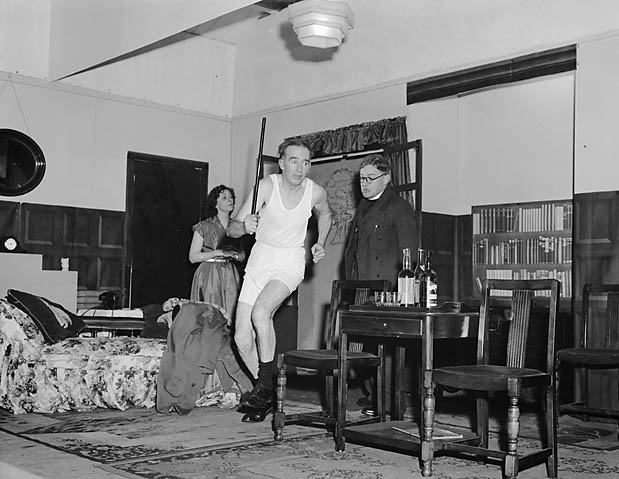
Gobowen Amateur Dramatic Society's presentation of See How They Run, 1954

Amateur theatre, also known as amateur dramatics, is theatre performed by amateur actors and singers. Amateur theatre groups may stage plays, revues, musicals, light opera, pantomime or variety shows, and do so for the social activity as well as for aesthetic values. Productions may take place in venues ranging from the open air, community centres, or schools to independent or major professional theatres.

Amateur theatre is distinct from the professional or community theatre because performers are usually not paid. Amateur actors are not typically members of actors' unions.

== Definition ==
Opinions vary on how to define "amateur" in relation to theatre. Technically speaking, an "amateur" is anyone who does not accept, or is not offered, money for their services. One interpretation of this is: "One lacking the skill of a professional, as in an art". Another is: "A person who engages in an art, science, study, or athletic activity as a pastime rather than as a profession".

An amateur actor is unlikely to be a member of an actors' union as most countries' trades unions have strict policies in place. In the United States, the Actors' Equity Association serves a similar purpose: to protect the professional industry and its artists.

While the majority of professional stage performers have developed their skills and studied their craft at recognised training institutions such as the Royal Academy of Dramatic Art (London), Juilliard School (New York) or National Institute of Dramatic Art (Sydney), amateurs are not usually professionally trained.

Amateur theatre (amateur dramatics) can be defined as "theatre performances in which the people involved are not paid but take part for their own enjoyment". Locally organised theatrical events provide a source of entertainment for the community, and can be a fun and exciting hobby, with strong bonds of friendship formed through participation. Many amateur theatre groups reject the "amateur" label and its negative association with "amateurish", preferring to style themselves "dramatic societies", "theatre groups" or just "players".

Scottish theatre-maker and writer Andrew Mckinnon in 2006 observed that the word 'amateur' has a negative connotation. Many amateur groups are therefore re-branding themselves as 'community' groups.

== Relationship to professional theatre ==
François Cellier and Cunningham Bridgeman wrote, in 1914, that prior to the late 19th century, amateur actors were treated with contempt by professionals. After the formation of amateur Gilbert and Sullivan companies licensed to perform the Savoy operas, professionals recognised that the amateur societies "support the culture of music and the drama. They are now accepted as useful training schools for the legitimate stage, and from the volunteer ranks have sprung many present-day favourites." Amateurs continue to argue that they perform a community service, while even in the 1960s, there was still, "particularly in professional quarters, a deep-rooted suspicion that amateur theatre is really an institution that exists in order to give significance to 'amateur dramatics' a frivolous kind of amusement with no pretention to art" or "as a base for starring the most popular and politically astute members" Nevertheless, many professional actors established their craft on the amateur stage.

After 1988, in the UK, membership in the actors' Equity union can no longer be made compulsory, and professional performers may perform with any amateur company. Some amateur companies engage professional directors. These changes are blurring the distinction between amateur and professional theatre. Amateur theatre is sometimes referred to in the UK as "non-commercial theatre". In recent times the distinction between 'amateur' and 'professional' has been blurred further, with professional companies encouraging community involvement in their productions through using local amateur companies. An example of this is the Royal Shakespeare Company's 2016 tour of A Midsummer Night's Dream: A Play for the Nation: in each of the 14 cities visited by the touring show, the company recruited local members of amateur companies to play the parts of Nick Bottom and the other Mechanicals.

== In the United Kingdom ==
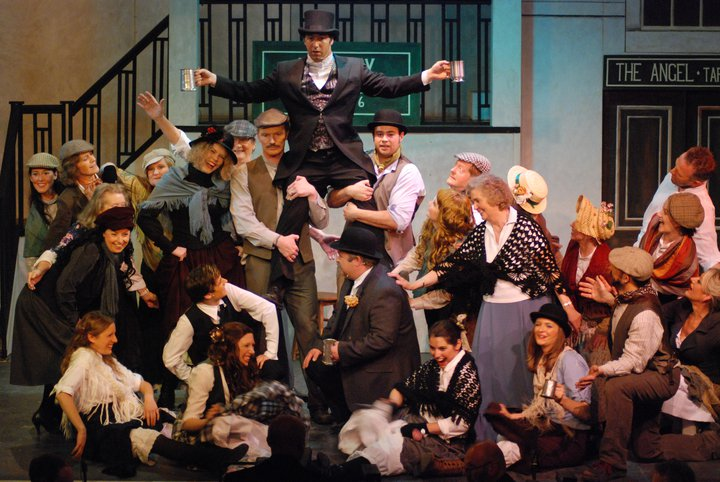
Beeston Musical Theatre Group performing My Fair Lady in Nottingham, England, 2011

People throughout Great Britain participate in amateur theatre as performers, crew or audience members and many children first experience live theatre during local amateur performances of the annual Christmas pantomime. Amateur theatre can sometimes be a springboard for the development of new performing talent with a number of professional actors having their first stage experiences in amateur theatre such as Liam Neeson (Slemish Players in Ballymena), Jamie Dornan (Holywood Players in Ballymoney), James Nesbitt (Ulster Youth Theatre) and Nathan Wright (in Dudley).

A survey carried out in 2002 by the major UK umbrella organisation for amateur theatre, National Operatic and Dramatic Association ("NODA"), noted that "Public support in the UK for amateur theatre is patchy", but found that the annual turnover of affiliated groups was £34 million from 25,760 performances with 437,800 participants, 29% of whom were under 21; attendances were 7,315,840.

An earlier, limited survey in England in 1991 revealed that only 19% of amateur drama groups were affiliated to a national "umbrella" organisation, suggesting that NODA's later survey may not reflect the true level of grass roots community involvement with amateur theatre.

In 2012 there were more than 2,500 amateur theatre groups putting on around 30,000 productions a year.

=== Umbrella organisations ===
Of the major bodies representing amateur theatre nationally, the National Operatic and Dramatic Association ("NODA") was founded in 1899 and in 2005 reported a membership of over 2,400 amateur theatre companies and 3,000 individuals staging musicals, operas, plays, concerts and pantomimes in venues ranging from professional theatres to village halls.

The Little Theatre Guild of Great Britain ("LTG") represents over 100 independent amateur theatres with auditoria from 64 to 450 seats, while the National Drama Festivals Association ("NDFA") caters for some 500 groups participating in around 100 local drama festivals. (See "Major Festivals" below)

There are regional bodies throughout the UK.

England
The All-England Theatre Festival ("AETF") caters for amateur theatre groups which participate in local drama festivals, and is also concerned with a similar number of festivals of one-act and full-length plays, involving a similar number of theatre companies. The AETF hold All-England Finals, the winners of which go forward to represent England at the National Festival of Community Theatre along with representatives from Northern Ireland, Scotland and Wales. Please see "Major Festivals" below.

As of January 2005, the Arts Council England was not providing any funding towards infrastructure organisations for amateur and community theatre, other than youth theatre through its support for the National Association of Youth Theatre. Other associations include Avon Association of Drama, Woking Drama Association, Somerset Fellowship of Drama, Spalding Amateur Dramatic And Operatic Society and the Greater Manchester Drama Federation ("GMDF") which holds annual festivals with 60+ active members.

Scotland
The Scottish Community Drama Association ("SCDA"), founded in 1926, works to promote all aspects of community drama in Scotland. SCDA received funding of £50,000 from the Scottish Arts Council in 2004-05.

Wales
The Drama Association of Wales ("DAW"), founded in 1934, exists to increase opportunities for people in the community to be creatively involved in drama. This is supported through the provision of training, new writing initiatives and access to an extensive specialist lending library containing plays, playsets and technical theatre books.

Northern Ireland
The Association of Ulster Drama Festivals ("AUDF") and is made up of three representatives from each member festival, as well as the Churches Drama League and Young Farmer Clubs. Founded in 1949 it aims "to foster and encourage amateur drama through the holding of Festivals of Drama, the fostering of relations and co-operation between Ulster Drama Festivals, and the fostering of relations with similar organisations in Northern Ireland and other regions ..."

=== Major festivals ===
There are many local festivals of amateur theatre within the UK and two major national and one international festival:

- National Festival of Community Theatre – run by the four regional associations
- British 'All Winners' Festival run by the National Drama Festivals Association
- International Gilbert and Sullivan Festival – an adjudicated competition in Buxton

=== Competitions ===
There a number of UK wide competitions that are organised by different bodies:

- The Little Theatre Guild of Great Britain (LTG) - Playwriting competition, run every two to three years.
- The National Drama Festivals Association (NDFA) - two playwriting competitions with a certificate and cash prize -
  - George Taylor Memorial Award (1979) in memory of the founder of Amateur Stage, funded jointly by Amateur Stage and NDFA.
  - Nan Nuttall Memorial Award (1994) to stimulate new writing for Youth Groups and encourage participation in Drama Festivals (in memory of a Secretary of Manchester & District Drama Federation.
- The Scottish Community Drama Association (SCDA) - "Play on Words" competition, Britain’s largest for new short plays, with three best entries winning support from professional writers.
- The Amateur Musical Theatre Challenge (2009) - to bring together amateur theatre groups from Scotland.
- Drama Association of Wales/Cymdeithas Ddrama Cymru (DAW) - Playwriting competition for one-act plays in Welsh or English and with a running time of 20 to 50 minutes. It is an annual event and attracts 250 entries from all over the world. In some years, entries are invited under a specific theme.
- National Festival of Community Theatre - The Geoffrey Whitworth Trophy (founder of the British Drama League) for "the best original unpublished play receiving its première in the first round of the National Festival of Community Theatre anywhere in the UK".

== In the United States ==
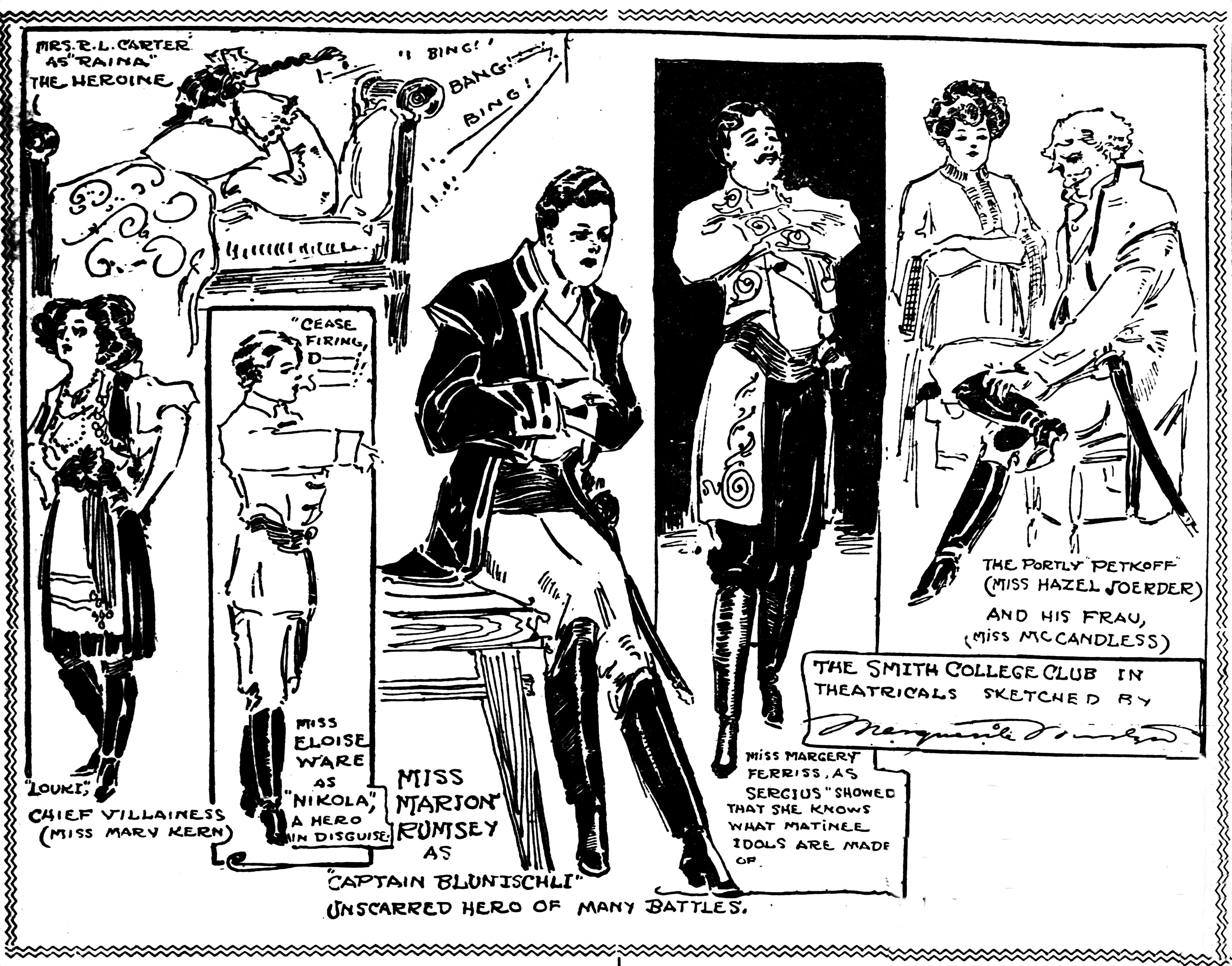
Actors of the Smith College Club of St. Louis are sketched rehearsing for an all-woman amateur benefit performance of George Bernard Shaw's "Arms and the Man" in December 1908. No men were allowed in the rehearsals or at the performance. The illustration is by Marguerite Martyn of the St. Louis Post-Dispatch.

In the United States, amateur theatre is generally known as community theatre. In 2009 there were 923 member organizations of the American Association of Community Theatre. Membership in this organisation is voluntary, making the actual number of community theatre organisations in the USA uncertain.

While the performers in community theatre are typically non-professional, there is a provision of the Actors' Equity Association which allows up to two paid professional actors to appear as guest performers in a community theatre production.

Community theatre organisations are eligible for non-profit status under article 501(c) of the United States Internal Revenue Code.

=== Umbrella organisations ===
The American Association of Community Theatre is the major umbrella association for community theatre in the United States. According to their website: "AACT is a nonprofit corporation that serves both individuals and organizations by providing expertise, assistance and support so that community theatres can provide the best possible theatrical experience for participants and audience alike." Among other activities the AACT sponsors a national theatre festival in odd-numbered years.

== In Australia ==
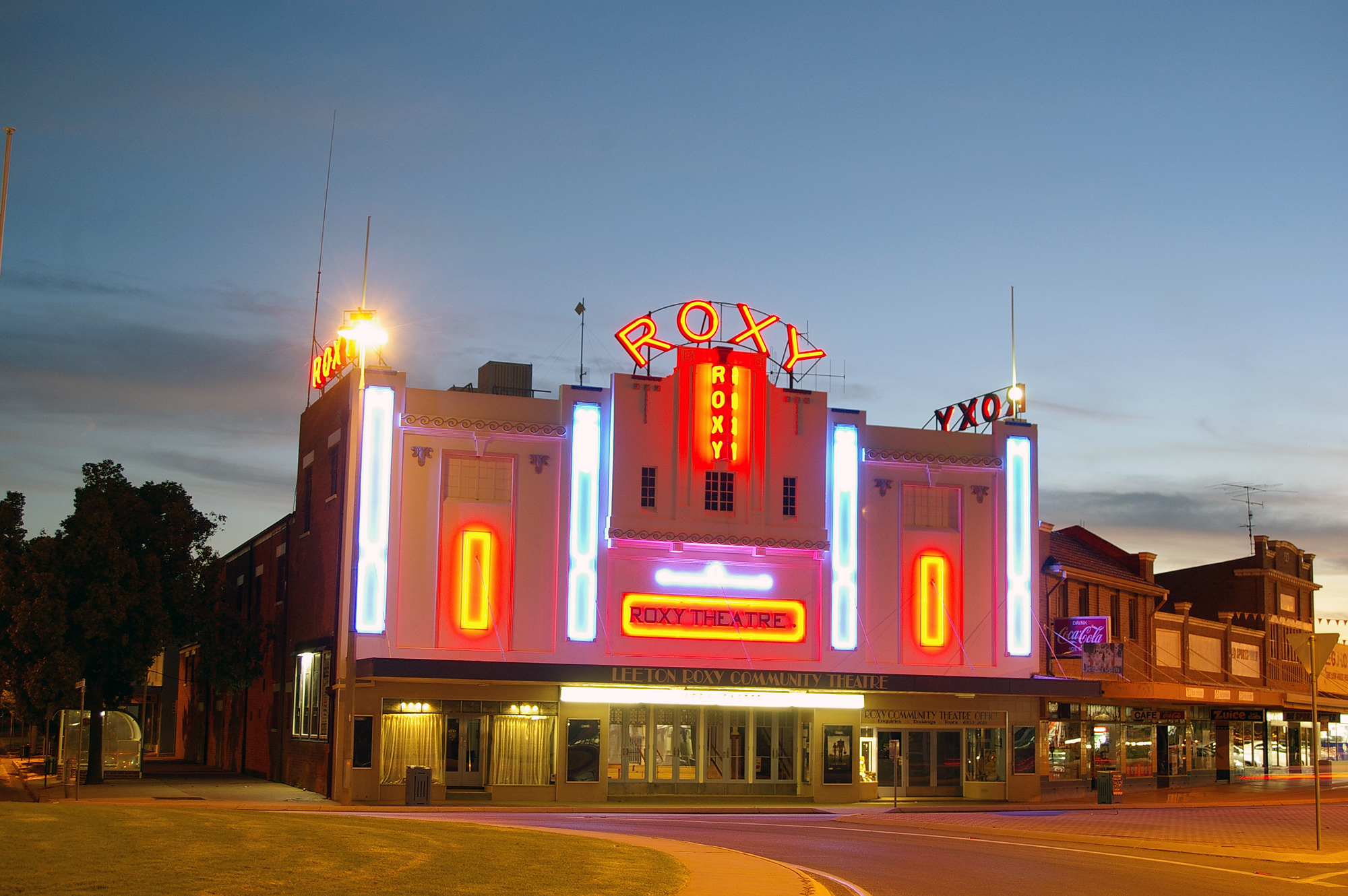
Roxy Community Theatre, Leeton, NSW

The Independent Theatre Association is the peak body for amateur or Community drama in Western Australia. Australian amateur theatre is dependent on volunteer effort and very few amateur theatres pay salaries, although some employ cleaners. Amateur acting experience is highly sought as an entry point for aspiring professionals. The annual Finley awards celebrate the achievements of theatres in several categories.

A Workers' Education Dramatic Society and student counterpart was active in Brisbane between 1930 and 1962.

== In New Zealand ==
There are many amateur theatre societies in New Zealand where it is often referred to as community theatre. The umbrella organization is called Theatre New Zealand (formally the New Zealand Theatre Federation) and was formed in 1970 out of a merger of the New Zealand branch of the British Drama League (established in 1932) and the New Zealand Drama Council (established in 1945).

== See also ==
- National Operatic and Dramatic Association
- Community theatre
- Actor
- Drama
- Theatre
