= RAFTA =

British theatre organization

Royal Air Force Theatrical Association
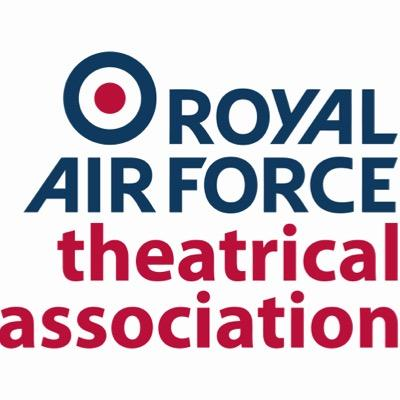
- Abbreviation: RAFTA
- Legal status: Registered Charity
- Chairman: Master Aircrew Richard Bratley
- President: Air Vice-Marshal Graham Russell
- Patrons: Sir Peter Hall CBE; Air Marshall Sir Frederick Sowrey KCB CBE; Stephen Daldry CBE; Gillian Plowman
- Affiliations: Royal Air Force, UK Armed Forces
- Website: www.rafta.co.uk

The Royal Air Force Theatrical Association is an association and registered charity which links theatre clubs at RAF stations around the world and provides information, training, adjudication and advice. RAFTA undertakes a bi-annual project to put on a large show at a professional theatre using resources from all affiliated clubs. There is an annual One-Act Play Festival (National Drama Festivals Association affiliated), play writing competition and play competition.

== History ==
The Royal Air Force Theatrical Association (RAFTA) was founded in 1974 and became a registered charity in 2011.

All three of the UK Armed Services have a long history that has encouraged theatrical activity, musical revues, concert parties, and the like, as a creative outlet which has led to many service men and women becoming established actors, directors and stage technicians. The formation of ENSA (Entertainments National Service Association) in 1939 solidified the UK forces' commitment to the provision of entertainment of service personnel both in the UK and abroad and the first major wartime Variety Concert was broadcast by the BBC from RAF Hendon in North London on 17 October of that same year.

Within the RAF, the station cinemas would often share facilities with the station theatre clubs to produce plays and concerts. Each station's club would encourage membership from both service personnel and their families and many retired service personnel went on to have theatrical careers.

=== Notable Individuals involved with RAF Theatre Clubs ===
Lord Richard Attenborough CBE

Pam Ayres MBE

Sir Alan Bates CBE

Rodney Bewes

Brian Blessed OBE

Richard Burton CBE

Max Bygraves OBE

Roy Dotrice OBE

Denholm Elliott CBE

Tony Hancock

Sir Rex Harrison

Sir Christopher Lee CBE

Bob Monkhouse OBE

Warren Mitchell

Dudley Sutton

In the 1970s it was decided that the RAF needed an umbrella organisation to co-ordinate the some 50 theatre clubs throughout the service and in 1974 RAFTA was founded by Group Captain Edgar Martyn Allies, Squadron Leader Mike Lambe and Group Captain Peter Gibson MBE.
