= Woking Drama Festival =

- Location: Woking
- Founded: 1959
- Founded by: Woking Drama Association
- Type of play: One Act with Youth Section
- Festival date: First two weeks of October
- Website: http://www.wokingdramafestival.co.uk/

The Woking Drama Festival (WDA) is one of the largest drama competitions in the British Isles for amateur dramatics focussing on one act plays with a dedicated Youth Section. It is notable not only for its size, but also for the quality of its leading performances, with the winner of the festival having gone onto win the British All Winners Festival on a number of occasions.

== Foundation ==
The festival is one of the most enduring amateur festivals of its kind in the United Kingdom, having been founded in 1959 and celebrating its 50th festival in 2008 (from 30 September 2008 to 11 October 2008). The festival is organised by the Woking Drama Association. The first winning play was "Master Dudley by Philip Johnson, performed by the Pyrford Little Theatre.

== Woking Drama Association ==
The Woking Drama Association, or WDA, was founded to encourage and support the performing arts in Woking. As such, most of the leading local theatre and drama groups in the Surrey area belong to the WDA, as well as from further afield across the south of England. The WDA is also affiliated to many of the leading drama associations, particularly the National Drama Festivals Association. One of its primary aims is to present an annual drama festival in Woking every October. Outside of the annual drama festival, the WDA works as a focal point for local theatre groups and as a point of reference for directors looking for on-stage talent, backstage; props; costumes or set building.

== Rhoda McGaw Theatre ==
The festival is held in Woking, Surrey, in the Rhoda McGaw Theatre (within The Ambassadors, Peacock Centre).

== Participating drama groups ==
Over the years the Woking Festival has grown to become "one of the largest drama competitions in the British Isles and certainly one of the most respected for its quality of performance". In 2008 the WDA had 16 member groups. Some notable groups that are or have been members of the festival are:

- Runnymede Drama Group
- Horsell Amateur Dramatic Society
- The Characters
- Ottershaw Players
- Godalming Theatre Group
- Woking Youth Theatre
- Another Theatre Company
- Storrington Theatre Workshop
- Woking College Theatre Company
- Send Amateur Dramatic Society
- Simply Theatre
- The Fringe Files
- Thursday night project
- Pyrford Little Theatre
- Brightlight Theatre Company
- Applause Youth Theatre Company

=== Subsequent success at the British All Winners Festival ===
As a festival affiliated to the National Drama Festivals Association, winners from Woking can be invited to participate in the NDFA's British All Winners Festival which they have done with some historical success. The winner from the Woking Drama Festival has gone on to win or attain the runner-up spot in the British All Winners Festival on a number of occasions:

- 2008: Winner – Send ADS with The Island by Athol Fugard
- 2007: Winner – Woking College Theatre Company with Home Free by Landford Wilson
- 2006: Runner-up – Runnymede Drama Group with And Go To Innisfree by Jean Lenox Toddie
- 2002: Winner – Runnymede Drama Group with Five Kinds of Silence by Shelagh Stephenson
- 2001: Runner-up – Storrington Theatre Workshop with The Room by Harold Pinter
- 2000: Winner – Runnymede Drama Group with Scarecrow by Don Nigro

== Awards ==
There are a number of awards that are contested for at the festival. These awards are adjudged by the adjudicator of the festival, who is required to be a member of GODA.

- The Bruzard Challenge Cup (Festival Winning Play) – donated in 1960 by the late Mr G.J. Bruzard of West Byfleet and presented for the festival winning play
- The Eileen Harper Memorial Trophy – donated in 1997 by members and supporters of the Woking Drama Association for presentation to the festival runners-up
- The Edna Nash Cup – donated in 1983 by the Runnymede Drama Group in memory of Edna Nash and presented for the third-place play
- The Youth Award – donated by the Woking Drama Association for the Best Play by a cast under 21 years of age on 1 September preceding the festival, provided that the total marks gained are at least 80 per cent of those gained by the festival winning play
- The Barbara Huntley Cup – donated in 1976 by Horsell Amateur Dramatic Society in memory of Barbara Huntley and presented as the Adjudicator's Award for any entry in the festival, or any feature of an entry, which the adjudicator considers to be of special merit and for which there is no other appropriate award
- The Godalming Theatre Group Celebration 85 Salver – for directing, donated in 1985 by the Godalming Theatre Group to commemorate their 21st year and presented to the director who, in the opinion of the adjudicator, has shown the most imagination and flair
- The Ian Home Rose Bowl – donated by friends in 1968 in memory of Iain Home of Pyrford Little Theatre and presented for the best performance by an actor
- The Richards-Smith Cup – originally donated by Mr. G. Richards-Smith for dramatic work in the Woking Music Festival and gratefully accepted by the Woking Drama Association in 1968 for presentation for the best performance by an actress
- The Handley-Jones Cup – donated in 1978 by the Old Woking Theatre Group in memory of H. Handley-Jones, originally for the best performance by any supporting player but reassigned by the Woking Drama Association in 1993 for presentation to the best supporting actor
- The Irene Hutchence Cup – donated in 1961 by the late Mrs Irene Hutchence of Horsell A.D.S., originally for the best play by an all-women cast but reassigned by the Woking Drama Association in 1993 for presentation to the best supporting actress
- The Desmond Holt Memorial Cup – donated in 1979 by the Godalming Theatre Group in memory of Desmond Holt and presented for the best performance by a junior player aged under 21 on 1 September preceding the festival
- The Guildbury Shield – for Technical Excellence, donated in 1984 by Guildbury Productions for presentation to the company who, in the opinion of the adjudicator, demonstrate the greatest appreciation of the role of staging techniques in the success of a production
- The Spotlight Award – for the best use of lighting, donated in 1985 by Councillor Mrs P.E. Bohling as Mayor of Woking in that year
- The Madeline Boden Rose Bowl – donated by Malcolm Boden in memory of his wife, Madeline, and presented for the best original play, defined for this purpose as one which has had no previous public performance
- The Pauline Brown Award – donated by Councillor Gordon Brown and Mrs. Pauline Brown, and presented by the Festival Stage Crew for the best backstage management
- The Graham Brockis Award (Best Use of Sound) – a new award introduced in 2005

=== Defunct awards ===
- The Runners-up Cup (1959–1996) – replaced in 1997 by The Eileen Harper Memorial Trophy
- The Best All-Women Play – in 1993 the Irene Hutchence Cup was reassigned by the Woking Drama Association for presentation to the best supporting actress
