= NFCT =

NFCT can refer to

- National Festival of Community Theatre
- New Israeli Foundation For Cinema & TV
- Non-federal control tower
- Northern Forest Canoe Trail
- North Fork Community Theatre, a community theatre on the North Fork of Long Island
