= Rhoda McGaw Theatre =

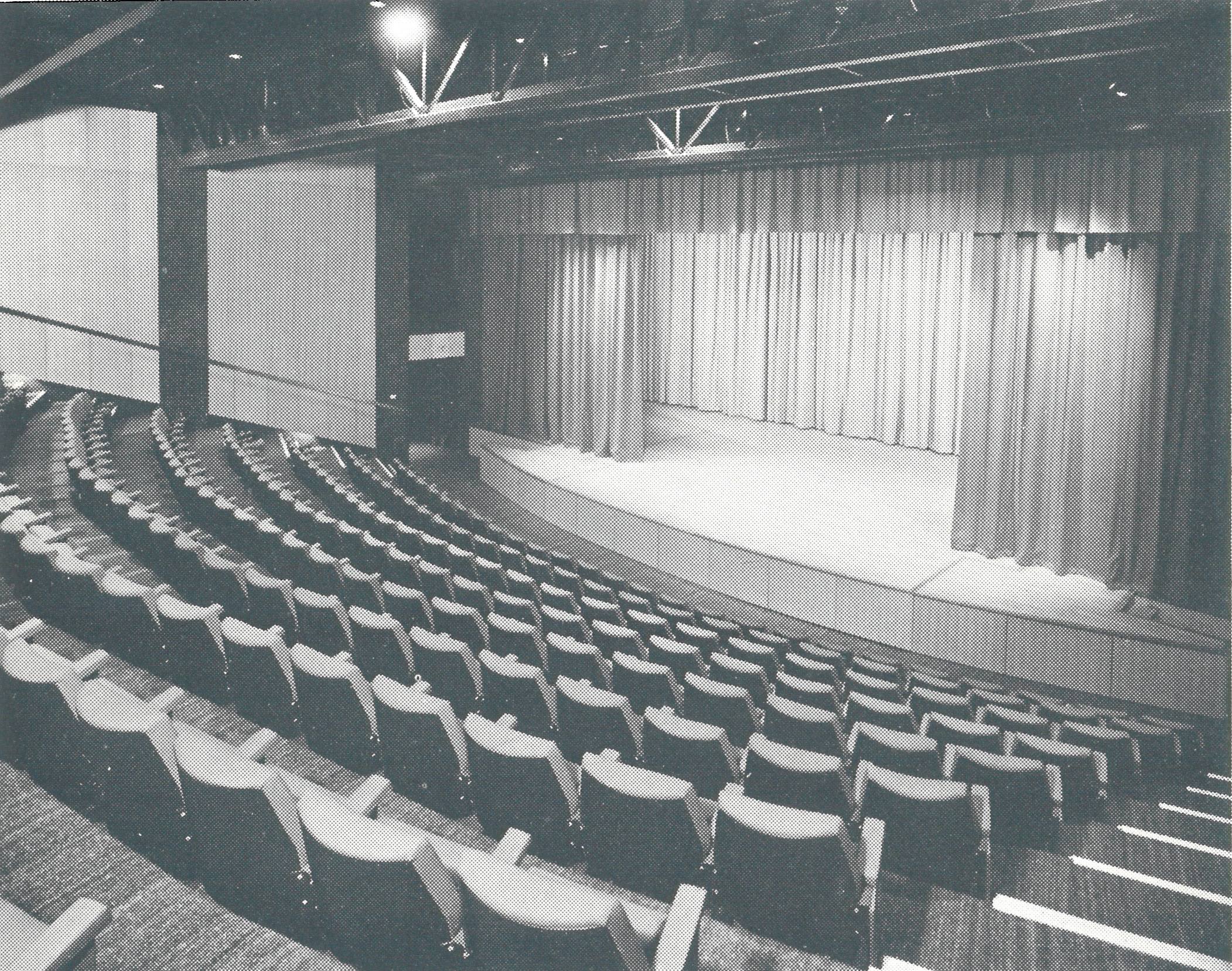

- Location within Surrey
- Address: Peacock Centre; Woking
- Coordinates: 51°19′14″N 0°33′35″W
- Operator: Ambassador Theatre Group
- Capacity: 228 (seated)
- Type: Theatre

Construction
- Opened: 1975
- Years active: 1975 – 1988; 1992 – present

Website
- Rhoda McGaw Theatre official website

The Rhoda McGaw Theatre is part of the entertainment complex adjacent to the Peacock Centre in Woking, Surrey.

The theatre seats 228 in 9 rows of raked seating and has been reported to have excellent acoustics. The stage is flat, 58’ wide from wall to wall, with a 36’ curtain opening. From the main tabs it is 19’ back to the cyclorama and 8’ forward to the front of the stage. The theatre has also been used by the Woking Drama Association ("WDA") to host the Woking Drama Festival and the British All Winners Festival on those occasions when it has been invited to do so by the National Drama Festivals Association. The venue has a unique relationship with the local council, whereby Woking Council owns and subsidises the theatre, with all the administration, staffing and technical facilities run by the Ambassador Theatre Group.

== History ==
Known to most simply as the Rhoda, construction work on the theatre was started in 1973 as part of the larger Woking Centre Halls complex; the cultural part of the redevelopment of Woking town centre at the time. The Centre Halls also included a Concert Hall for large functions, a library, a pool, and dining facilities (where prices ranged from £2.40 to £3.80 per head for a four course meal).

Work was completed on the complex in 1975 and the theatre was officially opened to the public under the management of Mike Kelly. A brochure produced when the Centre Halls first opened describes the Rhoda as an ‘intimately styled theatre’ with ‘well tiered and comfortable seating - for theatrical, operatic, concert, film and other similar productions’.

Named the Rhoda McGaw Theatre in memory of the local councillor who inspired Woking Council to fund the local dramatic community, the Rhoda has been pivotal in providing a venue for amateur and professional performances for over 40 years.

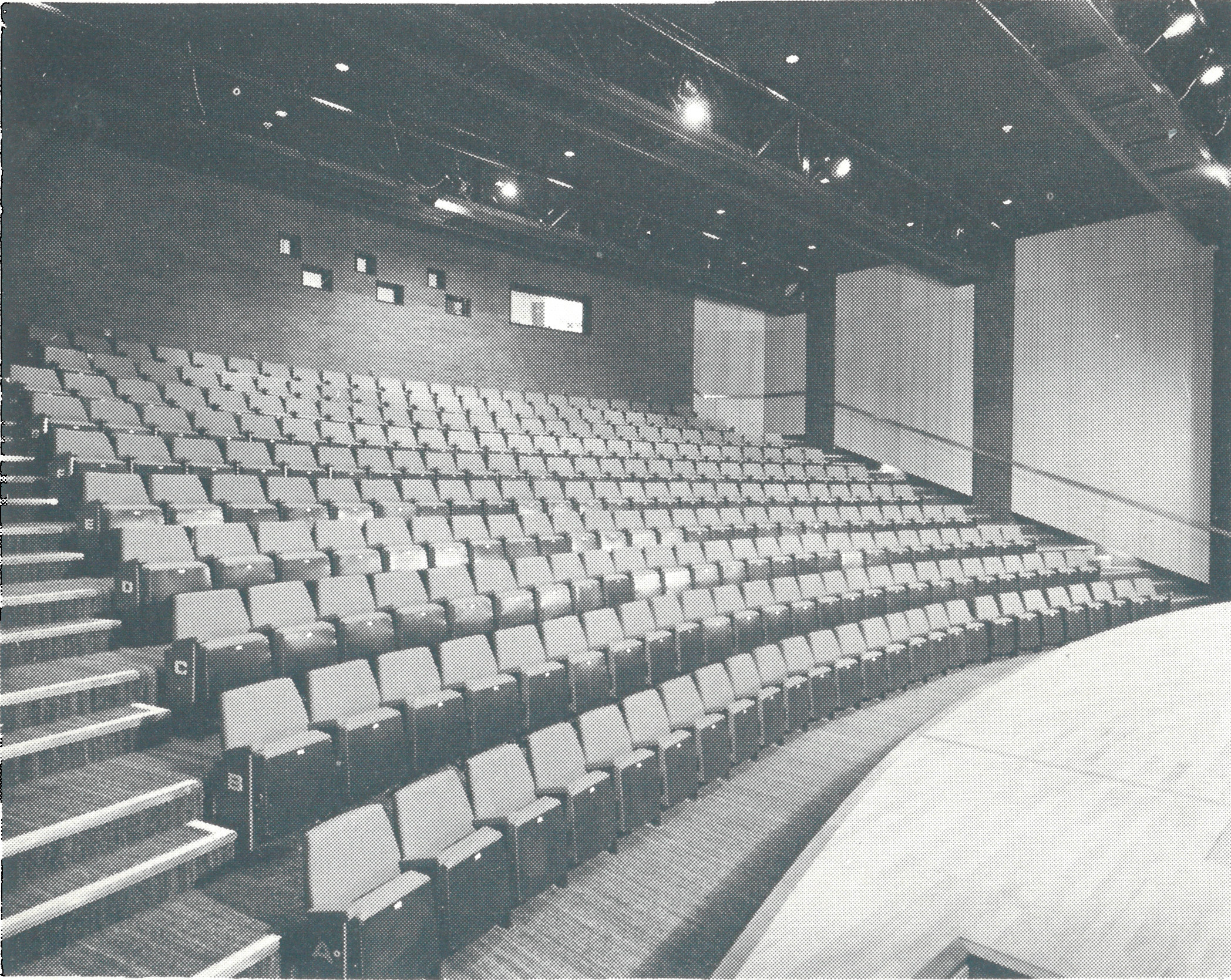

The Rhoda continued to be an important part of the Woking community for the next 13 years, putting on a range of popular shows including musicals, opera, dance, ballet, talent contests and dramas, along with the annual Panto and Miss Woking Whirl competition.

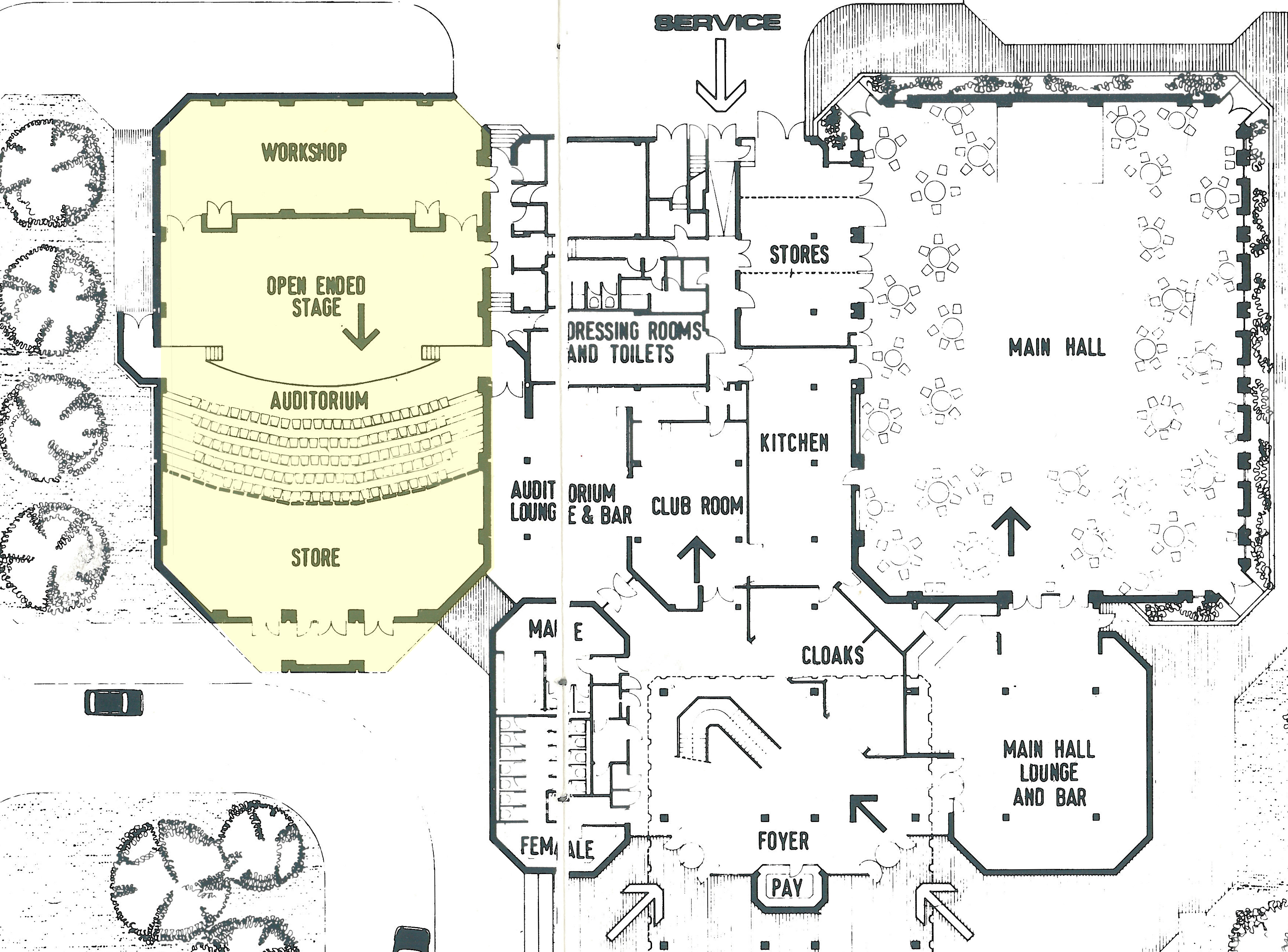

By the late 1980s, the theatre had become such an integral part of Woking life that when the whole of the Centre Halls complex was proposed to be demolished to make way for the creation of a new shopping centre and theatre complex there was outcry from the local community. After a series of arduous and protracted negotiations between local groups, such as the WDA, and Woking Borough Council, it was decided that the Rhoda McGaw Theatre would not be demolished, but instead ‘mothballed’ and incorporated into the new Peacocks centre.

The Rhoda closed in 1988 as the Centre Halls were demolished, and opened again 4 years later in 1992, with just a few modifications but now alongside the 1300-seat New Victoria Theatre. Overall control of both theatres, along with other arts and entertainment facilities in the new set-up, was vested in a company called Woking Turnstyle Ltd, creating a unique relationship with the local council, whereby the council owned and subsidised the Rhoda McGaw Theatre, with administration, staffing and technical facilities run by Woking Turnstyle Ltd. This was to insure the continued vision of councillor McGaw for the Rhoda to provide community theatre alongside the professional New Victoria Theatre.

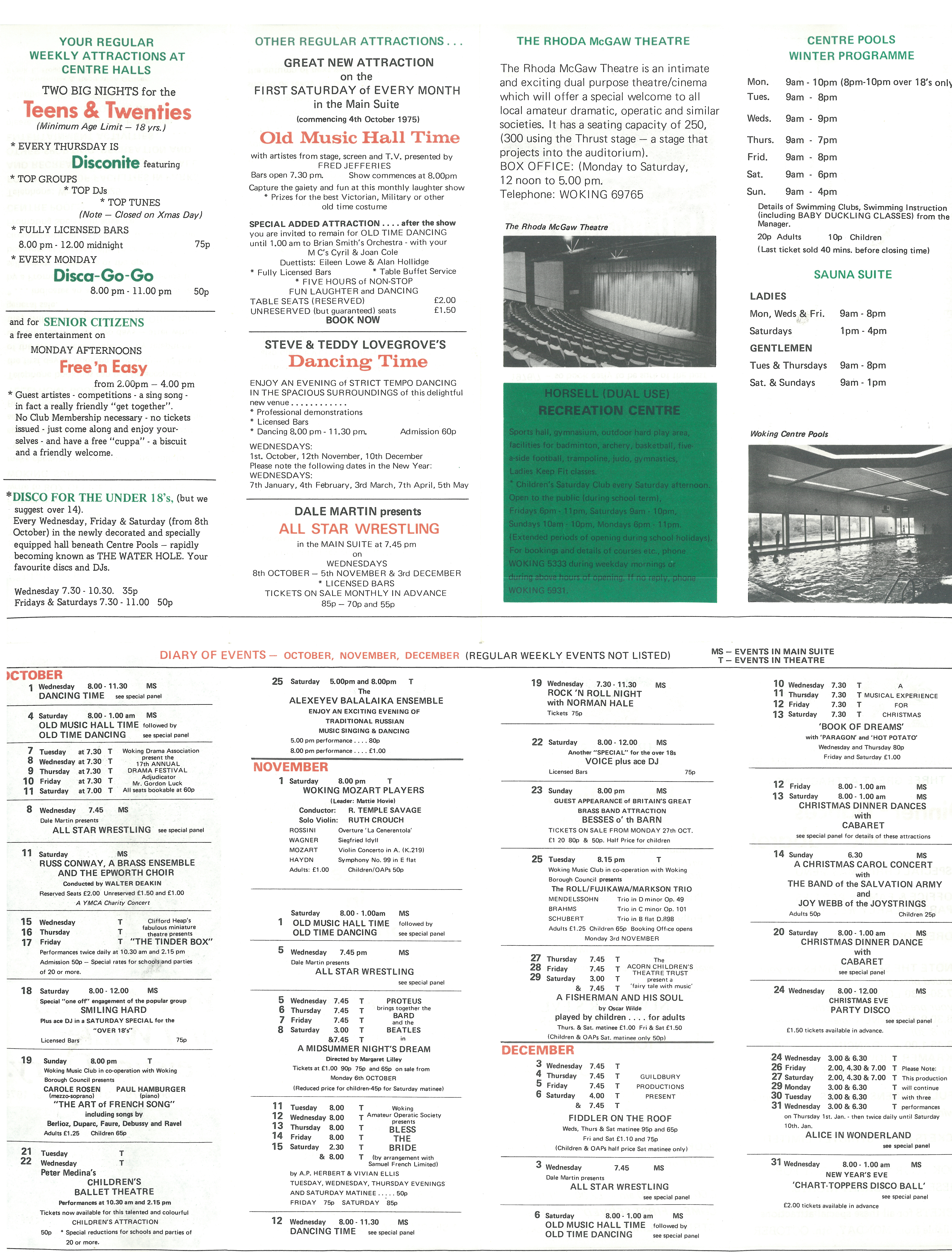

In 1997, the commercial side of the theatre became the Ambassadors Theatre Group (ATG), and over the years since then the Rhoda has had constant improvements. In 2002 the WDA raised £5,000, and together with matching funds from ATG, more stage lights, lighting desk and stage closed-circuit television was purchased. Most recently, 2012 saw the start of a major £400,000 on-going overhaul and refurbishment of the Rhoda’s facilities, funded by ATG and Woking Council.
