= Runnymede Drama Group =

English community theatre group

- Runnymede Drama Group
- Founded: 1948
- Location: United Kingdom
- Key people: Colin Dolley GODA
- Affiliations: National Drama Festivals Association
- Website: rdg.org

Runnymede Drama Group ("RDG") is a community theatre group based in Chertsey, Surrey that is notable for not only for its longevity, but also for its success both at a national and international level being one of the few groups to have won every major festival in the United Kingdom and having also been selected to represent the United Kingdom on the international stage.

== History ==
Based in the Surrey town of Chertsey, RDG was founded in 1948. It stages at least five productions each year, including drama festival entries. The group has also been noted for its production and promotion of new material, such as its 2000 production of Scarecrow.

== Festival honours ==
- National Drama Festivals Association - British All Winners Drama Festival
  - 2012 - Winners
  - 2006 - Runners-Up
  - 2002 - Winners
  - 2000 - Winners
  - 1993 - selected to appear in festival
  - 1977 - selected to appear in festival
- National Festival of Community Theatre
  - British Final Festival of One Act Plays
    - 2002 - Selected to represent England (winners of English festival)
    - 2000 - Overall Winners
    - 1993 - Selected to represent England (winners of English festival)
  - All-England Theatre Festival
    - 2002 - English Winners
    - 2000 - English Winners
    - 1996 - English semi-finalists
    - 1993 - English Winners
    - 1977 - English semi-finalists
- International Festival of Amateur Theatre - Mondial du Théâtre
  - Represented the United Kingdom in 2001 in Monaco.
