= Seascape with Sharks and Dancer =

1974 play by Don Nigro

- Written by: Don Nigro
- Characters: Tracy; Ben
- Original language: English
- Subject: Love; Trust
- Genre: Drama
- Setting: Ben's beach house on Cape Cod

Premiere
- Date premiered: Spring 1974
- Place premiered: University of Massachusetts Theatre Barn

Seascape with Sharks and Dancer is a 1974 play by Don Nigro. The story focuses on a young man, Ben, who saves a young woman named Tracy from the ocean outside his beach house. The struggle between his more tolerant approach to life and her fear of human relationships becomes the main conflict in the play.

Seascape had a sold out and critically acclaimed production at the Oregon Shakespeare Festival. It was originally produced at the Theatre Barn at the University of Massachusetts in Amherst, in the spring of 1974, directed by Marya Bednerik.

== Plot summary ==
The play begins on the night librarian/aspiring writer Ben rescues a beautiful naked woman, Tracy, from the ocean and brings her into his Cape Cod beach house to recuperate. Tracy claims it was not a suicide attempt but that she was dancing in the ocean. Ben doubts this but does his best to take care of her. Soon the two find that they have conflicting personalities, but try to work through them and gradually get closer to one another. Ben is fascinated and amused by her feisty behavior and eccentric sense of humor and falls for her. Tracy's first impulse is to break their connection, out of fear of the pain of loving someone and then inevitably losing them. As the story continues we see them struggling to find a way to save their difficult relationship, which is constantly threatened by Tracy's serious trust issues. After a crisis involving the possibility of an unexpected pregnancy, Tracy is finally able to reveal the origins of her fear of attachment in her childhood horror at the meaningless suffering of innocent creatures. The indifference of the universe to the suffering of the innocent is embodied for her in the eyes of the sharks in the ocean. The relationship with Ben has brought to the surface all of her deepest anxieties and fears.

== Themes ==
=== Love and Trust ===
Seascape With Sharks and Dancer examines themes of love and trust through an unconventional relationship. Although Ben expresses affection for Tracy, her past experiences make it difficult for her to fully trust him. She struggles between her desire for emotional connection and her fear of being hurt. When she eventually shares her private fears with Ben, it marks a shift in their relationship. However, the play does not present this as a clear resolution. By the end, it leaves unresolved the broader question of whether lasting trust between men and women is achievable.
