= National Festival of Community Theatre =

UK amateur theatre festival

United Kingdom Community Drama Festivals Federation
- Location: Location of participating festivals varies
- Founded: 1927
- Type of play(s): One Act Plays
- Festival date: July for the British Final Festival of One Act Plays
- Website: britishfinal.org.uk

The UKCDFF (formerly known as National Festival of Community Theatre), established in 1927, is a United Kingdom-based celebration of amateur theatre at the local, national and UK level. Each year, the national amateur organisations in the home nations promote a series of one-act play festivals and, through various eliminating rounds, take part in the final stage. The final stage is called the British Final Festival of One Act Plays, and includes companies and enthusiasts from all over the UK. A Standing Committee of representatives of the four countries has overall control of the Festival, with each country in turn taking the responsibility for organising it.

The four partners in the United Kingdom Community Drama Festivals Federation are:

- All-England Theatre Festival (AETF)
- Association of Ulster Drama Festivals (AUDF)
- Association of Wales (DAW)
- Scottish Community Drama Association (SCDA)

The festivals provide an opportunity for amateur companies to appear in new and varying venues before widely differing audiences, to receive constructive criticism from a qualified adjudicator (GoDA), and to compare the standard of their own work with that of the other companies taking part. For audiences, the public adjudication of performances offers a deeper understanding and appreciation of theatre.

The productions from Scotland, England, Wales and Northern Ireland will all have been publicly adjudicated at each stage. The overall winner receives the Howard de Walden Ewer award.

== Structure ==
Local festivals lead selected companies to a National Final Festival in each country, from which one company is selected to represent its country at the British Final Festival. All four annual rotating host countries of the Final remain in contact throughout the eliminating competition.

- England - All-England Theatre Festival
- Wales - Wales Final Festival of One Act Plays
- Scotland - SCDA Festival
- Northern Ireland - Ulster One-Act Finals

== British Final Festival of One Act Plays - results ==
The winners of the festival are presented with the Howard de Walden Trophy.

Year	Nat	Winners	Participants				Venue	Location	Adjudicator			
Year	Nat	Winners	.	.	.	England	Venue	Location	Adjudicator	Northern Ireland	Scotland	Wales
2012	SCO	Kirkton Players	Total Arts Community Theatre (The Tempest by William Shakespeare)	The Clarence Players (The Droitwich Discovery by TBC)	Kirkton Players (In the Blinking of an Eye by Jeremy Hylton-Davies)	Blackwood Little Theatre (Biscuits by TBC)	Torch Theatre	Milford Haven, Wales	Ian Sarginson GoDA			
2011	SCO	Tryst Theatre ‘C’	Old Town Theatre Company (The Recidivists by TBC)	The Newpoint Players (Can’t Stand Up for Falling Down by TBC)	Tryst Theatre ‘C’ (Art (Act I) by TBC)	New ‘Tabs’ Players (A Kind of Vesuvius by TBC)	Wyvern Theatre	Swindon, England	Mike Tilbury GoDA			
2010	NIR	Lurig Drama Group Cushendall	Oasis Youth Theatre (One Million To Stop The Traffik by Mark Wheeller)	Lurig Drama Group Cushendall (Melody by Deirdre Kinahan)	Thistle Theatre Company (The Hitch-Hiker by Lucille Fletcher)	The Unknown Theatre Company (Cotton Girls by Scott Tobin)	The Village Theatre	Pitlochry, Scotland	Dr Russell Boyce BA DSD FRSAMD FRSE			
2009	SCO	Kirkton Players	Total Arts Community Theatre (Moll Flanders by J Machen)	The Clarence Players (A Little Something For The Ducks by Jean Lennox Toddle)	Kirkton Players (Two by Jim Cartwright)	New "Tabs" Theatre (But Yesterday by Jimmy Chinn)	Ardhowen Theatre	Enniskillen, Northern Ireland	Walker Ewart GoDA			
2008	SCO	Stewarton Drama Group	St Paul's Drama Group (Happy Jack by John Godber)	The Holywood Players (The Bay at Nice by David Hare)	Stewarton Drama Group (One Good Beating by Linda McLean)	Blackwood Little Theatre (Last Tango in Blackwood by David Tristram)	Taliesin Arts Centre, Swansea University	Swansea, Wales	Chris Jaeger GoDA			
2007	ENG	Total Arts Community Theatre	Total Arts Community Theatre (Find Me by Olwen Wymark)	Theatre 3, Newtownabbey (The Dumb Waiter by Harold Pinter)	Wick Players (The Pushcart Peddlers by Murray Schisgal)	The Players Theatre (Gelligaer) (The Bridge by Gabe Torrens)	Solihull Arts Complex, Solihull	Birmingham, England	Scott Marshall GODA			
2006	NIR	Holywood Players	St. Ursula Players (Me and My Friend (Act 1) by Gillian Plowman)	Holywood Players (The Invisible Man by Jennifer Johnston)	Kirkintilloch Players (Shakers Re-Stirred by John Godber & Jane Thornton)	Phoenix Theatre Company (Mediocrity by Anton Robert Krueger)	Perth Theatre, Perth	Perth, Scotland	Brian Marjoribanks			
2005	ENG	Another Theatre Company	Another Theatre Company (After Liverpool by James Saunders)	( )	Kirkton Players (Plaza Suite [Act III] by Neil Simon)	Tenby Players (Interior Designs )	Riverside Theatre, Coleraine	Coleraine, Northern Ireland	Michael O'Hara			
2004	ENG	The Young Theatre (at Beaconsfield)	The Young Theatre (at Beaconsfield) (Ball Boys by David Edgar)	Theatre 3, Newtownabbey (Elegy for a Lady by Arthur Miller)	Tryst Theatre (Travels with my Aunt by Graham Greene)	New Tabernacle Players (Asylum by Alex Baum)	Aberystwyth Arts Centre,	Aberystwyth, Wales	Chris Yeager			
2003	SCO	Kirkton Players	St. Austell Players (On the Road Again by Lawrence Allan)	Theatre 3, Newtownabbey (The Rats )	Kirkton Players (The Steamie abridged version by Tony Roper)	Players Anonymous (The Bespoke Overcoat )	Gaiety Theatre,	Douglas, Isle of Man				
2002	SCO	Kirkton Players	Runnymede Drama Group (Bed by Jim Cartwright )	( )	Kirkton Players ('Bouncers' abridged version by John Godber)	New Tabernacle Players (The Train )	Eden Court Theatre	Inverness	Richard Wilson			
2001	SCO	Wick Players	Riverside Players (The Art of Remembering by Adina L Ruskin)	Bangor Drama Club (Say Something Happened by Alan Bennett)	Wick Players (A Bench at the Edge by Luigi Jannuzi)	Car Boot Theatre Company (Extraordinary Revelations of Orca )	,	Belfast	Billy Burns MBE, BA (GODA)			
2000	ENG	Runnymede Drama Group	Runnymede Drama Group (Lear's Daughters by Elaine Feinstein and The Woman's Theatre Company)	( )	Kirkton Players (Laundry and Bourbon by James McLure)	Players Theatre (Return Journey )	North Wales Theatre, Llandudno	Llandudno, Wales	Irene Rostron			
1999	SCO	Kirkton Players	Total Arts Community Theatre Co. ( )	( )	Kirkton Players (The Dumb Waiter by Harold Pinter)	Phoenix Theatre Company (Blah Blah Blah )	,	,				
1998	SCO	Wick Players	Pump House Theatre Company ( )	( )	Wick Players (Lone Star by James McLure)	Phoenix Theatre Company (The Donahue Sisters )	,	,				
1997	SCO	Kirkintilloch Players	Broseley Amateur Dramatic Society ( )	( )	Kirkintilloch Players (The Dancing Fusilier (Original Play) by Mike Tibbetts)	Phoenix Theatre Company (Low Comedy Woman )	Northern Ireland	,				
1996	ENG	Barn Theatre Club, Welwyn Garden City	Barn Theatre Club, Welwyn Garden City (Plaza Suite [Act III] by Neil Simon)	( )	Stromness Drama Club (The Measures Taken by Brecht)	Telstars Theatre Company (Albert )	,	,				
1995	ENG	Dewsbury Arts Group	Dewsbury Arts Group (The Last Yankee by Arthur Miller)	( )	Tryst Theatre (September in the Rain by John Godber)	Telstars Theatre Company (A New Interest In Life )	,	,				
1994	ENG	Reigate Amateur Theatrical Society	Reigate Amateur Theatrical Society (Ball Boys by David Edgar)	( )	Lochcarron ADS (From Here to the Library by Jimmie Chinn)	Players Anonymous (Count Albany )	Arts Guild Theatre	Greenock, Scotland				
1993	SCO	Dunaverty Players	Runnymede Drama Group (Fragments by Murray Schisgal)	( )	Dunaverty Players (A Slight Ache by Harold Pinter)	Castaway, Aberystwyth (Three More Sleepless Nights )	Ardhowen Theatre,	Enniskillen, Northern Ireland	Roma Tomelty			
1992	WAL	Castaway, Aberystwyth	Dewsbury Arts Theatre ( )	( )	George Square Players (The Donahue Sisters by Geraldine Aron)	Castaway, Aberystwyth (After Liverpool by James Saunders)	,	,				
1991	NIR	Bangor Drama Club	Players Theatre, Skelmersdale ( )	Bangor Drama Club (The Donahue Sisters by Geraldine Aron)	Tryst Theatre (Teechers by John Godber)	Castaway, Aberystwyth (The Maids by Jean Genet)	,	,				
1990	ENG	The Headley Players, Bristol	The Headley Players, Bristol (Bouncers by John Godber)	( )	Old Grammarians ADS (Kissed with a Loving Seal by Eric Paice)	( )	,	,				
1989	ENG	East Essex Players, Southend on Sea	East Essex Players, Southend on Sea (Day of the Dog by Graham Swannell)	( )	Crossmichael Drama Club (Can You Hear the Music by David Campton)	( )	,	,				
1988	SCO	Old Grammarians ADS	Players Theatre, Skelmersdale ( )	( )	Old Grammarians ADS (The Birthday Party by Harold Pinter)	( )	,	,				
1987	ENG	Heath Players, Box Hill, Surrey	Heath Players, Box Hill, Surrey (Private Lives [Act II] by Noël Coward)	( )	Tryst Theatre (Childhood )	( )	,	,				
1986	WAL	Players Theatre, Rhondda	Headley Players, Bristol ( )	( )	Lochcarron ADS (Once Upon a Seashore )	Players Theatre, Rhondda (The Forced Marriage by Molière)	,	,				
1985	ENG	Riverside Players, Heswall	Riverside Players, Heswall (Skirmishes by Catherine Hayes)	( )	Falkirk Players (The American Dream by Edward Albee)	Parc and Dare Theatre Company (One O'clock From the House )	,	,				
1984	NIR	Bangor Drama Club	Barn Theatre Club, Welwyn Garden City ( )	( )	Liberton Kirk Drama Group (Rise and Shine by Elda Magill Cadogan)	Bangor Drama Club (Winners by Brian Friel)^{Note 1}	,	,				
1983	ENG	Bournemouth Little Theatre Club	Bournemouth Little Theatre Club (Little Eyolf by Henrik Ibsen)	( )	Eastwood Entertainers (The Mayor of Torontal by Gwenyth Jones)	( )	,	,				
1982	WAL	Players Theatre, Rhondda	Barn Theatre Club, Welwyn Garden City ( )	( )	Tryst Theatre (The Scheming Lieutenant by Richard Brinsley Sheridan)	Players Theatre, Rhondda (Sganarelle by Molière)	,	,				
1981	ENG	Harodian Theatre, London	Harodian Theatre, London (Playing With Fire by Barbara Field)	( )	Eastwood Entertainers (The Fish )	Berwyn Amateur Theatre Club (A Night Out )	,	,				
1980	SCO	Old Grammarians ADS	Maidenhead Players ( )	( )	Old Grammarians ADS (The Brute by Anton Chekhov)	Ynysybwl Theatre Group (The Real Inspector Hound )	,	,				
1979	SCO	Tryst Theatre	Barn Theatre Club, Welwyn Garden City ( )	( )	Tryst Theatre (Equus [Act I] by Peter Shaffer)	Ynysybwl Theatre Group (Visitor From Forest Hills )	,	,				
1978	ENG	Extension Theatre Company	Extension Theatre Company (Lessons To Be Learned by Dave Lodge)	( )	George Square Players (The Orchestra )	Players Theatre (See You Tomorrow )	,	,				
1977	WAL	Players Theatre, Rhondda	Riverside Players, Heswall ( )	( )	Broadford Drama Group (A Respectable Wedding by Bertolt Brecht)	Players Theatre, Rhondda (After I'm Gone by Frank Vickery)	,	,				
1976	NIR	Slemish Players, Ballymena	St Ursula Players, Bristol ( )	Slemish Players, Ballymena (No Why by Unknown)	Thurso Players (The Lady Aoi by Yukio Mishima)	( )	,	,				
1975	ENG	Maidenhead Players [Christian Council]	Maidenhead Players [Christian Council] (Was He Anyone by N. F. Simpson)	( )	Dunaverty Players (Rise and Shine by Elda Magill Cadogan)	( )	,	,				
1974	NIR	Clarence Players, Belfast	Maidenhead Players ( )	Clarence Players, Belfast (Doreen by Unknown)	Larbert High School F P D S (One Season's King by George MacEwan Green)	( )	,	,				
1973	ENG	Claverley ?	Claverley Theatre Club (The Miracle Worker by William Gibson)	( )	George Square Players (Barnstable )	( )	,	,				
1972	ENG	Wye Players, Hereford	Wye Players, Hereford (Trevor by Unknown)	( )	The Florians, Inverness (Mutatis Mutandis by David Campton)	( )	,	,				
1971	ENG	Wye Players, Hereford	Wye Players, Hereford (How's the World Treating You by Roger Milner)	( )	Old Grammarians ADS (Hey Johnnie Cope by Jimmy Logan)	( )	,	,				
1970	SCO	Greenock Players	Whitley Bay Theatre Club ( )	( )	Greenock Players (A Shilling For The Beadle by James Scotland)	( )	,	,				
1969	WAL	Pontllanfraith W I	Sands Players (USA Airforce) ( )	( )	Troon Players (Philipp Hotz's Fury by Max Frisch)	Pontllanfraith W I (The Nine Fathers by Unknown)	,	,				
1968	SCO	Old Grammarians ADS	Y.M.C.A. Players, Hereford ( )	( )	Old Grammarians ADS (The Proposal by Anton Chekhov)	( )	,	,				
1967	SCO	Stirling Amateur Dramatic Society	South Norwood A.T.W.G. ( )	( )	Stirling Amateur Dramatic Society (The Birthday Party by Harold Pinter)	( )	,	,				
1966	SCO	George Square Players	Rickmansworth Players ( )	( )	George Square Players (The Long Christmas Dinner by Thornton Wilder)	( )	,	,				
1965	SCO	Edinburgh Graduate Theatre	Stewart & Lloyds A.D.S. ( )	( )	Edinburgh Graduate Theatre (Getting and Spending by Michael J. Chepiga)	( )	,	,				
1964	WAL	Llynsafaddan Players	Harlequins Theatre Co. Carshalton ( )	( )	Stirling Amateur Drama Club (Himself When Young )	Llynsafaddan Players (They Simply Fade Away by T C Thomas)	,	,				
1963	NIR	Belfast Drama Circle	Southampton Student Players ( )	Belfast Drama Circle (Heaven Is An Island by Unknown)	Kirkwall Arts Club (The Long and the Short and the Tall by Willis Hall)	( )	,	,				
1962	SCO	Greenock Players	Link Players, Manchester ( )	( )	Greenock Players (Tail-Piece by Unknown)	( )	,	,				
1961	ENG	Oxford House Players	Oxford House Players (God Is My Mountain by Sybil Hollingdrake)	( )	Riverside Former Pupils D C, Stirling (What Every Woman Knows - Act I by J.M. Barrie)	( )	,	,				
1960	ENG	St Dunstan's Players, Bristol	St Dunstan's Players, Bristol (In the Zone by Eugene O'Neill)	( )	George Square Players (The Crucible - Act III by Arthur Miller)	( )	,	,				
1959	NIR	Belfast Drama Circle	Y.M.C.A. Players, Hereford ( )	Belfast Drama Circle (Liberation by Unknown)	Nairn Drama Club (Idea for a Play by Richard Tydeman)	( )	,	,				
1958	SCO	Edinburgh People's Theatre	( )	( )	Edinburgh People's Theatre (Who Loves Moraig [Act I] by Jack Ronder)	( )	,	,				
1957	ENG	Grangetown Boys' Club D G, Middlesbrough	Grangetown Boys' Club D G, Middlesbrough (Sordid Story by J.A.S Coppard)	( )	Greenock Players (Ae Market Nicht )	( )	,	,				
1956	SCO	Greenock Players	( )	( )	Greenock Players (The Reve's Tale by Unknown)	( )	,	,				
1955	WAL	Llynsafaddan Players	( )	( )	Huntly Gordon School F P D C (Still Waters by Delsie Darke)	Llynsafaddan Players (Davy Jones Dinner by T.C.Thomas)	,	,				
1954	ENG	Octave Theatre Club, Northwood	Octave Theatre Club, Northwood (The Wedding Morning by Arthur Schnitzler)	( )	Torch Theatre Club (A Surgeon for Lucinda by Jimmy Scotland)	( )	,	,				
1953	SCO	Barrhead Players' Club	( )	( )	Barrhead Players' Club (The Masterfu' Wife by Agnes Adam)	( )	,	,				
1952	ENG	Sutton Amateur Dramatic Club	Sutton Amateur Dramatic Club (The Heiress [Act II] by Augustus Goetz & Ruth Goetz)	( )	Glasgow Jewish Institute Players (Lucrezia Borgia's Little Party by A J Talbot)	( )	,	,				
1951	SCO	Barrhead Players' Club	( )	( )	Barrhead Players' Club (Displaced Persons by Elizabeth Milne)	( )	,	,				
1950	ENG	West Hertfordshire Players' Club	West Hertfordshire Players' Club (The Proposal by Anton Chekhov)	( )	Paisley Old Grammarians A D S (The Changeling by Thomas Middleton and William Rowley)	( )	,	,				
1949	ENG	Birmingham International Centre	Birmingham International Centre (Pullman Car Hiawatha by Thornton Wilder)	( )	Paisley St John's Church Dramatic Club (Wind Along the Waste by Thomas Maclachlan Watson)	( )	,	,				
1948	WAL	Little Theatre, Aberdare	( )	( )	Barrhead Players' Club (A Bit of Land by Agnes Adam)	Little Theatre, Aberdare (Birds of a Feather by Thomas Doran)	,	,				
1947	WAL	Newport Civil Defence Dramatic Society	( )	( )	Torch Theatre Club (Possession )	Newport Civil Defence Dramatic Society (Jephthah's Daughter by Elma Levinger)	,	,				
1940 to 1946		Break of 7 years for the duration of World War II										
1939	ENG	Unity Theatre Club, London	Unity Theatre Club, London (Plant in the Sun by Ben Bengal)	( )	Stirling Amateur Dramatic Club (Shells )	( )	,	,				
1938	ENG	Midland Bank Dramatic Society, London	Midland Bank Dramatic Society, London (Count Albany by Donald Carswell)	( )	Ardeer Recreation Club Drama Section (In The Zone by Eugene O'Neill)	( )	,	,				
1937	ENG	Newcastle Central Y W C A Drama Club	Newcastle Central Y W C A Drama Club (The Willing Spirit by Unknown)	( )	Newbattle Burns Club Dramatic Society (Hewers of Coal by Joe Corrie)	( )	,	,				
1936	ENG	Guild of Abbey Players, Abingdon	Guild of Abbey Players, Abingdon (The Spartan Girls by Unknown)	( )	Forfar Dramatic Society (The Dreamer )	( )	,	,				
1935	ENG	Welwyn Thalians	Welwyn Thalians (Not This Man by Unknown)	( )	Edinburgh Elocution Club (Martha )	( )	,	,				
1934	SCO	Barr & Stroud Dramatic Society, Glasgow	( )	( )	Barr & Stroud Dramatic Society, Glasgow (What Every Woman Knows [Act I] by J.M. Barrie)	( )	,	,				
1933	ENG	Birkenhead Institute Old Boys Drama Society	Birkenhead Institute Old Boys Drama Society (The Road of Poplars by Vernon Sylvaine)	( )	Golspie Women's Rural Institute (Glensheugh by Joe Corrie)	( )	,	,				
1932	ENG	The Players' Club, Beaconsfield	The Players' Club, Beaconsfield (On the High Road by Anton Chekhov)	( )	Edinburgh Women's Athletic Club (Symphony in Illusion by James Wallace Bell)	( )	,	,				
1931	SCO	Falkirk High School F P D C	( )	( )	Falkirk High School F P D C (Ardvorlich's Wife by Gordon Bottomley)	( )	,	,				
1930	ENG	Hampstead Play & Pageant Union	Hampstead Play & Pageant Union (The Man Who Wouldn't Go To Heaven by F. Sladen-Smith)	( )	Falkirk High School F P D C (Singing Sands )	( )	,	,				
1929	ENG	Liverpool Playgoers	Liverpool Playgoers (The Devil Among the Skins by Ernest Goodwin)	( )	Edinburgh Elocution Club (The Wooin' O't by W.D. Cocker)	( )	,	,				
1928	SCO	Ardrossan & Saltcoats Players	( )	( )	Ardrossan & Saltcoats Players (The Old Lady Shows her Medals by J.M. Barrie)	( )	,	,				
1927	ENG	Welwyn Garden City Society	Welwyn Garden City Society (Mr Sampson by John Sherman)	( )	Blaigowrie & Rattray A O D S (Campbell of Kilmhor by J.A. Ferguson)	( )	,	,				
