= Rex Walford =

British scholar, educator and former journalist

Rex Walford OBE FRGS
- Born: Rex Ashley Walford; 14 February 1934
- Died: 2 January 2011 (aged 76)
- Other names: United Kingdom

Rex Ashley Walford, OBE, FRGS (14 February 1934 – 2 January 2011) was a British scholar, educator, and former journalist, who in later life specialised in teaching others to teach geography.

== Education ==
Walford was a strong supporter of lifelong learning and, in addition to serving as a tutor with Cambridge's Institute of Continuing Education, continued his own studies throughout his life. From 1952 to 1955, he studied at the London School of Economics, graduating with a Bachelor of Science (BSc) degree. Then, he attended King's College, London, graduating with a Postgraduate Certificate in Education (PGCE) teaching qualification in 1956, and a Bachelor of Divinity (BD) degree after only two years of study in 1958. He studied for a master's degree from Northwestern University, Illinois, between 1960 and 1961. In 2003, he was awarded a Doctor of Philosophy (PhD) degree by Anglia Polytechnic University: his doctoral thesis was titled "'As by magic': the growth of 'new London', north of the Thames 1918-1945 and the response of the Church of England" and combined his love of geography with his strong Christianity.

== Career ==
His first career was as a journalist for the Hendon Times (1951–58), but then turned to teaching as head of geography at a Church of England secondary school in Hendon, London (1958–62). In 1962, he made his final career change, moving into academia as a lecturer in geography and mathematics at Maria Grey College a teacher training college in London: he rose to principal lecturer and served its senior tutor. Then, from 1973 until his retirement in 1999, he taught geography and education at the University of Cambridge: he was elected a Fellow of Wolfson College, Cambridge in 1988, and served as Head of the Department of Education in the 1990s.

== Personal life ==
Walford was a committed Anglican Christian. While at university, he served as national chairman of the Student Christian Movement (1956–1957). He was also involved with amateur dramatics, and served on the council of the Guild of Drama Adjudicators of Great Britain from 1970.

In 1969, Walford married Wendy Kirby at John Keble Church, Mill Hill.

On 2 January 2011, he was a passenger on a boat travelling across the River Thames from Pharaoh's Island to Shepperton when it overturned: a non-swimmer, he was one of two people to die in the accident.

== Honours ==
In 1990, he was awarded the Back Award by the Royal Geographical Society. In the 2000 New Year Honours, he was appointed Officer of the Order of the British Empire (OBE) for services to geographical scholarship.

== Selected works ==
- Walford, Rex (2001). Geography in British Schools, 1850-2000: Making a World of Difference. Psychology Press. ISBN 9780713002072.
