= Bromley Little Theatre =

Community theatre

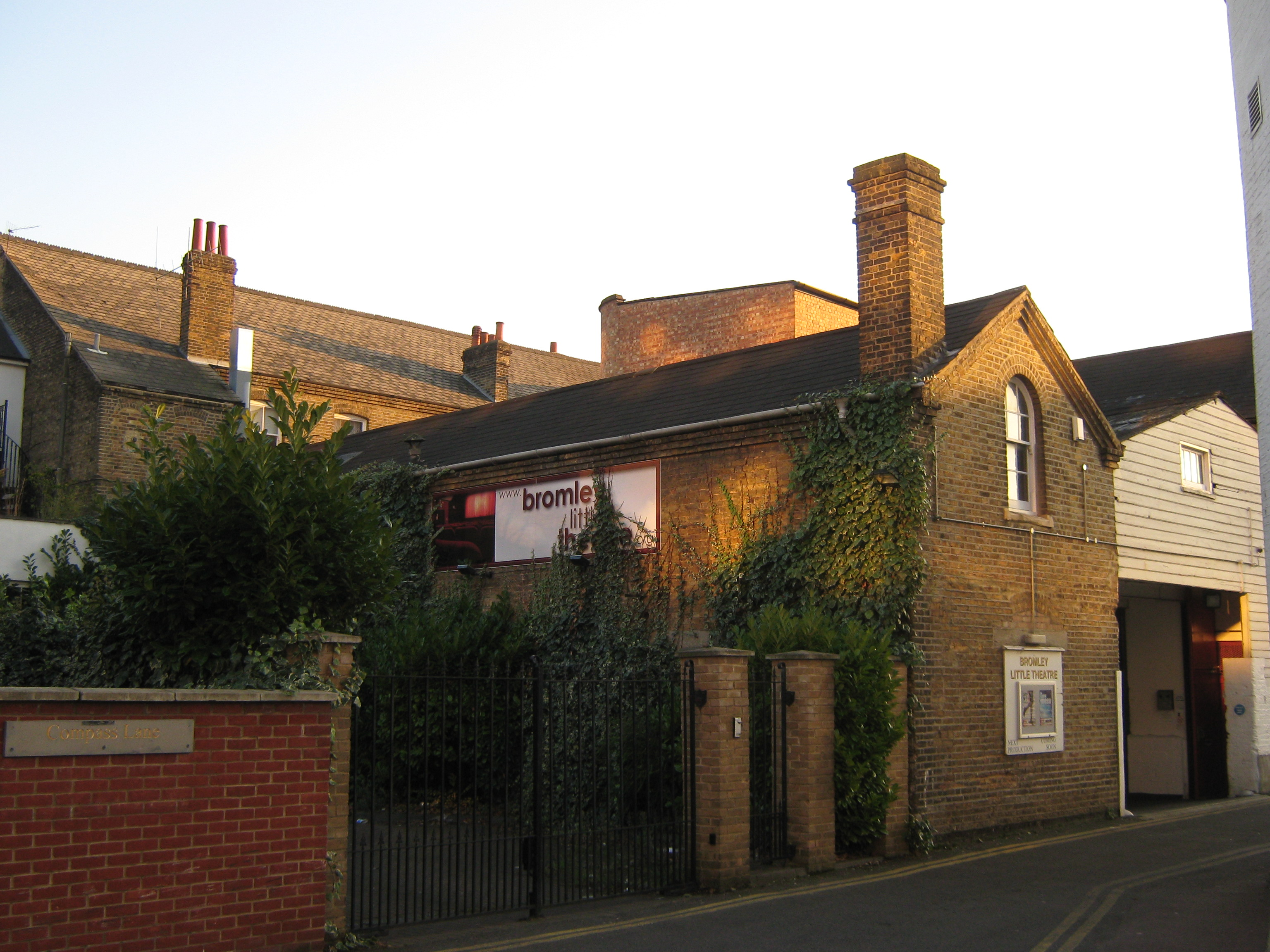
- Exterior of Bromley Little Theatre in November 2010
- Interactive map of Bromley Little Theatre
- Location: Bromley; London, BR1; United Kingdom
- Coordinates: 51.4077287°N 0.0138006°E
- Capacity: 113
- Type: Community theatre
- Public transit: Bromley North

Construction
- Opened: 1938; 88 years ago

Website
- Official website

Bromley Little Theatre is a community theatre in Bromley in the London Borough of Bromley, England and is a member of the Little Theatre Guild of Great Britain. Its president is the actor Michael York.

The theatre was established in 1938 on its present site which was converted from an old Victorian bakery. The theatre has over 1,000 members split into full and audience-only groups, all the staff, cast and crew are volunteers.

The theatre's repertory members present approximately 11 shows each year as well as a number of smaller productions which are performed in the open "Bar Area". Performances run for around eight nights, apart from Sunday evenings when the theatre stage is used to showcase local or touring bands, among other events.

== Notable alumni ==
- Fenella Fielding – Film actor
- Windsor Davies – Television actor
- Michael York – Film actor
- Derek Jacobi – Theatre, Television, and Film Actor
- Prunella Scales – Television actor
- Jude Law – Film actor
- Scott Clifton Lucy -Theatre, Television Actor and Presenter
- Sarah Hoare – Theatre, Television, and Film Actor
- Barbara Kirby – Theatre, Television, and Film Actor
- Jeremy Brett
- Eileen Atkins
- June Brown

== Live music ==
The theatre additionally hosts live music, this is typically on a Sunday which is a rest-day for whichever theatrical show is on, most notably in recent years as the Bromley Blues Club which in conjunction with genre experts Mississippi MacDonald and the Bourne Music Club have had notable artists from the UK and Worldwide Blues scene.
