= All-England Theatre Festival =

- All-England Theatre Festival Logo
- Location: Location of participating festivals varies
- Founded: 1947
- Type of play(s): One Act Plays
- Festival date: Final – June
- Website: http://www.aetf.org.uk/

The All-England Theatre Festival ("AETF") organises the only countrywide eliminating contest for one-act plays in performance throughout England. It provides an opportunity for Amateurs to compete against like-minded groups and to benefit from the adjudication they receive to improve the quality of their performance. The AETF also maintains contact with other leading bodies involved in Amateur Dramatics throughout the United Kingdom by means of its membership of the Central Council for Amateur Theatre, The Drama Festivals Consortium and the British Finals Standing Committee. The festival is also involved with the Geoffrey Whitworth Trophy Competition, in conjunction with the other 'Hosts' of the British Festival, to judge original unpublished scripts that are first produced within the relevant festivals.

== History ==
=== British Drama League ===
The history of the All-England Theatre Festival dates back to 1919, when the British Drama League was formed. The public inauguration of the league took place at the Theatre Royal, Haymarket on 22 June and was said by the first director of the league, Mr. Geoffrey Whitworth, that "Drama was par excellence the art of the people, and the Theatre everyone's business". There was a wide range of individuals on the first committee. The Drama League was in essence an association composed of individual co-operators in amateur drama and affiliated amateur dramatic groups. It was very active in the pursuit of the creation of a National Theatre. One of the main planks of the Drama League was its Education platform. This evolved into a strong commitment to new writing and eventually the establishment of competitive Festivals. It provided a central organisation for amateur societies throughout England (despite the name "British"), it conducted drama schools and ran a drama library. By June 1923 there were 360 affiliated societies which included amateur and professional bodies. In 1926 professionals were expressing concern that the rapid growth of amateur drama was likely to cause problems with too many people trying to enter an already overcrowded profession. A Council Meeting was held to discuss this and in 1927 it was noted that the league's monthly journal 'Drama' was selling 3000 copies. This interest had started a British 'Festival of Community Drama' which was used to find an entry for the American New York Little Theatre Tournament. Other aspects of the league's work included the making of a substantial contribution to the Stratford-on-Avon Memorial Theatre, visits to Europe to help establish Festivals and the organisation of summer schools.

=== The early festivals ===
It has been argued that 1926 is the most important date in the history of the revival of the one-act play. The reason being that it was in 1926 that the British Drama League held its first experimental festival of one-act plays. In its first year seven societies took part in the competition, or festival as it was known. The next year the number was up to one hundred and fifty. In 1930 the number was 400, in 1932 600, and by 1936 seven hundred and forty seven groups had entered. Very quickly a system of rounds had therefore been developed to cope with the numbers of entries. There was a first round at a regional level from which adjudicators would send their selections forward to a second round. Another set of adjudicators would then send a selection forward to a final round held annually in London. This final round, started in 1927, included Scottish entries, thus there was no English Final as such.

In 1927, the Scottish counterpart of the British Drama League, the Scottish Community Drama Association, had set up their own annual knockout festival which experienced similar success and by 1937 was attracting around three hundred and fifty entries. The Scottish festival had its own Scottish final, which went on to the London final to compete with English teams.

In 1938 the final of the National Festival was held outside London for the first time following the invitation of the Scottish Community Drama Association. The war brought a significant reduction in the league's membership but activities continued as best they could throughout. The emphasis changed somewhat to encourage Youth clubs and military units for educational purposes.

=== The English only finals ===
After the Second World War the regions started to organise their own Festivals and the first England only Final was held in 1947. Until 1957 the organisation of subsequent annual Finals continued to be run by the British Drama League and eventually became the remit of the All England Theatre Festival. After 1957 the role of the British Drama League gradually faded away to be replaced by a mixture of support groups. The British Drama League became the British Theatre Association, with effect from 1 November 1972 and for financial reasons was dissolved in 1990. Its collections of play scripts (presented by Annie Horniman) are held in the most part by the Theatre Museum in London with the remaining part of the collection held by the Drama Association of Wales.

== Structure ==
The All-England Theatre Festival organises an eliminating series of Festivals which leads ultimately to the English Finals. The winner of the English Final goes on to compete in the British Final Festival of One Act Plays against the winners of similar Festivals in Wales (Drama Association of Wales's Wales Final Festival of One Act Plays), Scotland (Scottish Community Drama Association's SCDA Festival) and Northern Ireland (Association of Ulster Drama Festivals's Ulster One-Act Finals). This "British Final Festival of One Act Plays" is the culmination of the National Festival of Community Theatre in the United Kingdom.

England is divided into 4 Areas for the purposes of this Festival. Each Area is also divided into a number of Divisions according to the size and / or history of the individual Areas. Each division has a number of festivals and, dependent on the festival, either the winner or the winner and runner-up will proceed to the Divisional Quarter Final. The winners of the Divisional Quarter Finals go forward to the Area Semi-final. The winners of the four Area Semi-finals go forward to the English Final. The member festivals in 2008 were as follows:

- English Final – contested by winners of semi-finals below
  - Northern Area – Semi Final – contested by winners of quarter-finals below
    - North West Division – Quarter Final
      - Cumbria District
      - West Pennine District
      - Merseyside Preliminary Round
      - Manx Amateur Drama Federation, One Act Play Festival
    - North Central Division – Quarter Final
      - Nidderdale & District Drama Festival
      - Richmond Festival
    - North East Division – Quarter Final
      - Hull & East Riding District Festival
      - Saltburn '53 Festival
  - Central Area – Semi-final – contested by winners of quarter-finals below
    - Central Division (Central Area) – Quarter Final
      - Leicester & Rutland Festival
      - Tamworth Hastilow Festival
      - Stoke-on-Trent Annual One Act Festival
      - Warwickshire Play Festival
    - Western Division (Central Area) – Quarter Final
      - Hereford County Festival
      - Birmingham's Festival of Acting and Musical Entertainment
      - The Worcester Theatre Festival
      - The Shropshire Drama Festival
  - Eastern Area – Semi-final – contested by winners of quarter-finals below
    - North Division (Eastern Area) – Quarter Final
      - Bedford Drama Festival
      - Cambridge Festival
    - South Division (Eastern Area) – Quarter Final
      - Southern Counties Drama Festival
      - Elmbridge Festival
    - East Division (Eastern Area) – Quarter Final
      - Southend Festival
      - Waltham Forest Festival of Theatre
    - West Division (Eastern Area) – Quarter Final
      - Maidenhead Drama Festival
  - Western Area – Semi-final – contested by winners of quarter-finals below
    - Central Division (Western Area) – Quarter Final
      - Avon Drama Festival
      - Bristol Drama Festival
      - Cheltenham One Act Play Festival
      - Somerset County Drama Festival
      - Harold Joliffe One Act Play Festival
    - Southern Division (Western Area) – Quarter Final
      - Dorset Drama League
      - The Totton Drama Festival
    - Western Division (Western Area) – Quarter Final
      - The Teignmouth Festival
      - Cornwall Festival
      - Exmouth Festival

== The Shropshire Drama Festival ==
The Shropshire Drama Festival is organised annually in Spring by the Shropshire Drama League. It seeks to showcase the best in amateur theatre from around the county and is an initial round of the "All England Theatre Festival" . The competition is organised into both adult and youth sections and each competing team presents a one-act play. A professional adjudicator from the Guild of Drama Adjudicators judges the teams and announces winners. The winning team is then eligible to represent Shropshire in succeeding rounds of the knockout competition which culminates in the British Final in June.
