= Drama Association of Wales =

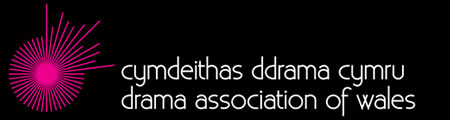
Drama Association of Wales logo, rebranded in 2010

The Drama Association of Wales was founded in 1934, a registered charity since 1973 and was core funded by the Arts Council of Wales from 1974 to 2011. The function of DAW is to increase opportunities for people in the community to be creatively involved in drama. This is supported through the provision of training, new writing initiatives and access to an extensive lending library containing plays, play-sets and technical theatre books.

In April 1991, DAW acquired the British Theatre Association playsets, making the association the world's largest specialist English language lending library.

DAW plays an active role as part of the National Festival of Community Theatre, with seven regional festivals held throughout Wales between March and May.

In Spring of 2011 funding from the Arts Council of Wales ceased and the library was moved to the Royal Welsh College of Music and Drama. §
