= Ilkley Playhouse =

Theatre in Ilkley, West Yorkshire, England

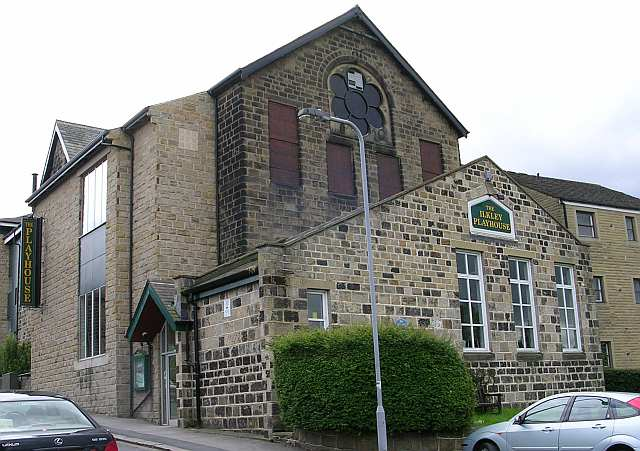
- Interactive map of Ilkley Playhouse

Website
- ilkleyplayhouse.co.uk

Ilkley Playhouse is a live theatre in Ilkley, Bradford, England. It is owned and run by Ilkley Players Ltd a not-for-profit charitable organisation. Ilkley Playhouse is run by an Executive Committee and is staffed almost entirely by volunteers drawn from its membership.

Ilkley Playhouse is dedicated to the presentation of live amateur theatre and other arts activities within the community and welcomes members and visitors to a season of ten main-house and three studio productions per annum, plus many other events including touring productions and special events. It also hosts community arts events such as the Ilkley Film Society and the Ilkley Literature Festival. Ilkley Players Ltd is a member of the Little Theatre Guild of Great Britain. (LTG)

The Ilkley Playhouse also runs Greenroom classes for younger students who annually perform their own productions.

In October 2020, during the COVID-19 pandemic, Ilkley Playhouse was awarded a much-needed grant from Arts Council England of £60,454.
