= Priory Theatre =

Amateur theatre building and company in Kenilworth, UK

Coordinates: 52.347731°N 1.578209°W

The Priory Theatre is an amateur theatre building and company located in Kenilworth, Warwickshire, England. It has 120 seats arranged in a circle and stall layout.

== Company history ==
The original company was named the Kenilworth Players and was formed in 1932, first performing on a portable stage in the ballroom of the old Abbey Hotel. The company went on hiatus with the outbreak of the Second World War.

In 1945, the players purchased a former Christadelphian and Unitarian chapel on Rosemary Hill near Abbey Fields and the ruined St Mary's Abbey. This building, in the Perpendicular Gothic Revival style, dates from 1816. The ‘new’ theatre, still their current location, was opened on 8 April 1946. Improvements to the building since then include the installation of the circle in 1947, additional changing rooms and a kitchen in 1952, and the current foyer was built in 1965.

In 1968, the company changed its name to the Priory Theatre Company and four years later was admitted to the Little Theatre Guild of Great Britain. A devastating fire partially gutted the building in 1976; however, productions started again just two years later.

In 1979, the group purchased the former National School building, 100 yards away, for rehearsals and as a wardrobe room. The foyer was most recently redeveloped in 1999 and the dressing rooms in 2006.
