= One-Act Play Festival =

Competitive theater festival

A One-Act Play Festival is a festival of one-act plays, often in a competitive format. Plays are usually presented over a weekend, week or longer period. If the festival includes a competition, plays are normally judged by an independent adjudicator, such as a member of GODA.

In the UK there are two main organisations operating festivals

- All England Theatre Festival (AETF)

This is a knock-out competition covering several regional rounds and resulting in an "All England" final

- National Drama Festivals Association (NDFA)

Each festival is distinct but at the end of the year the adjudicators select the best plays to enter a "British All Winners" competition.

For a recently published study of the one-act play, see Stephen Murray, Taking Our Amusements Seriously. LAP, 2010. ISBN 978-3-8383-7608-0.
