= The Bob Hope Theatre =

Community theatre in Eltham, England

Bob Hope Theatre
- Eltham Little Theatre
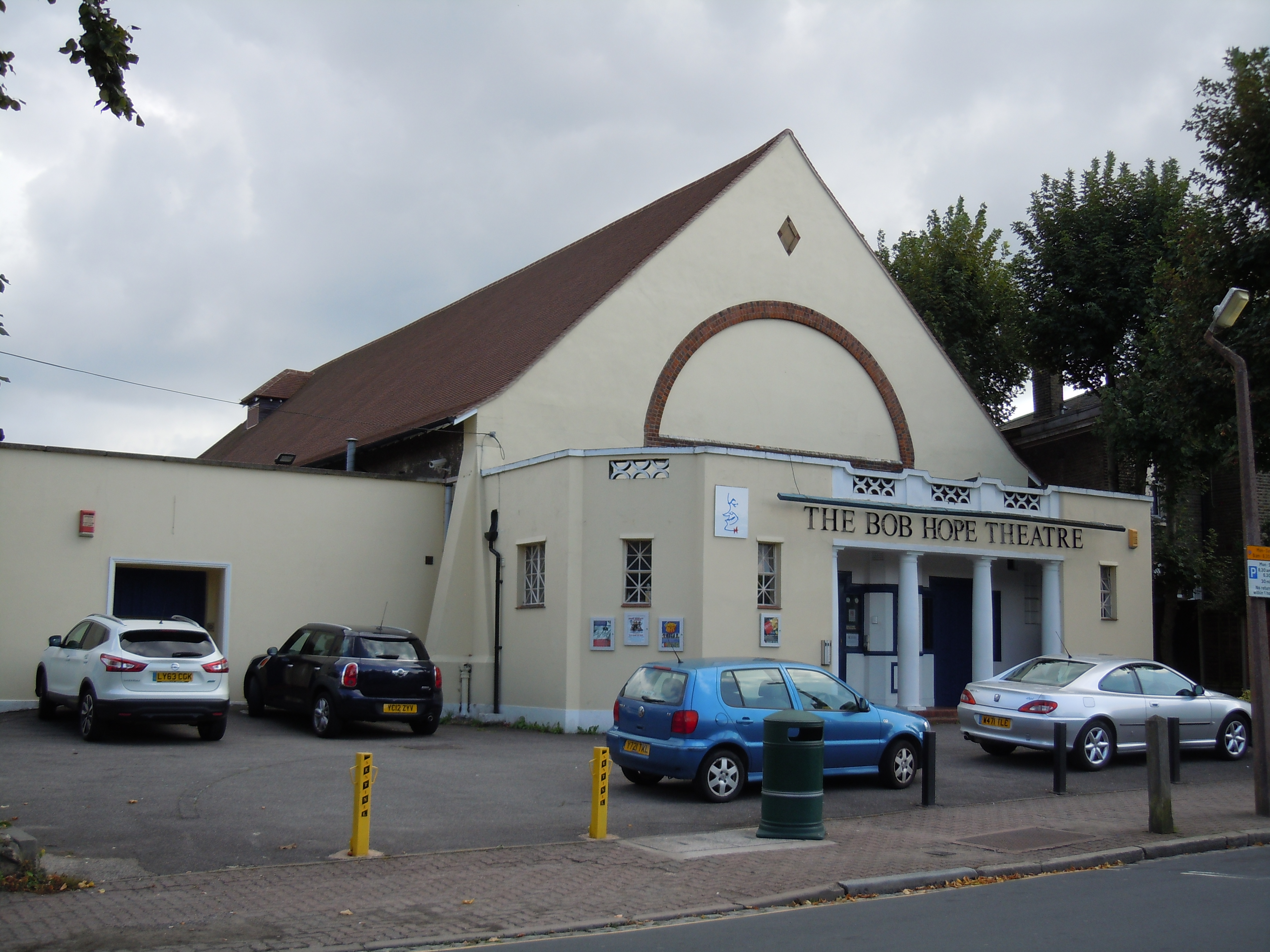
- Interactive map of Bob Hope Theatre
- Location: Eltham; London, SE9; United Kingdom
- Coordinates: 51.4494°N 0.0504°E
- Owner: Theatre members
- Type: Community theatre
- Public transit: Eltham

Construction
- Opened: 12 November 1943; 82 years ago

Website
- Official website

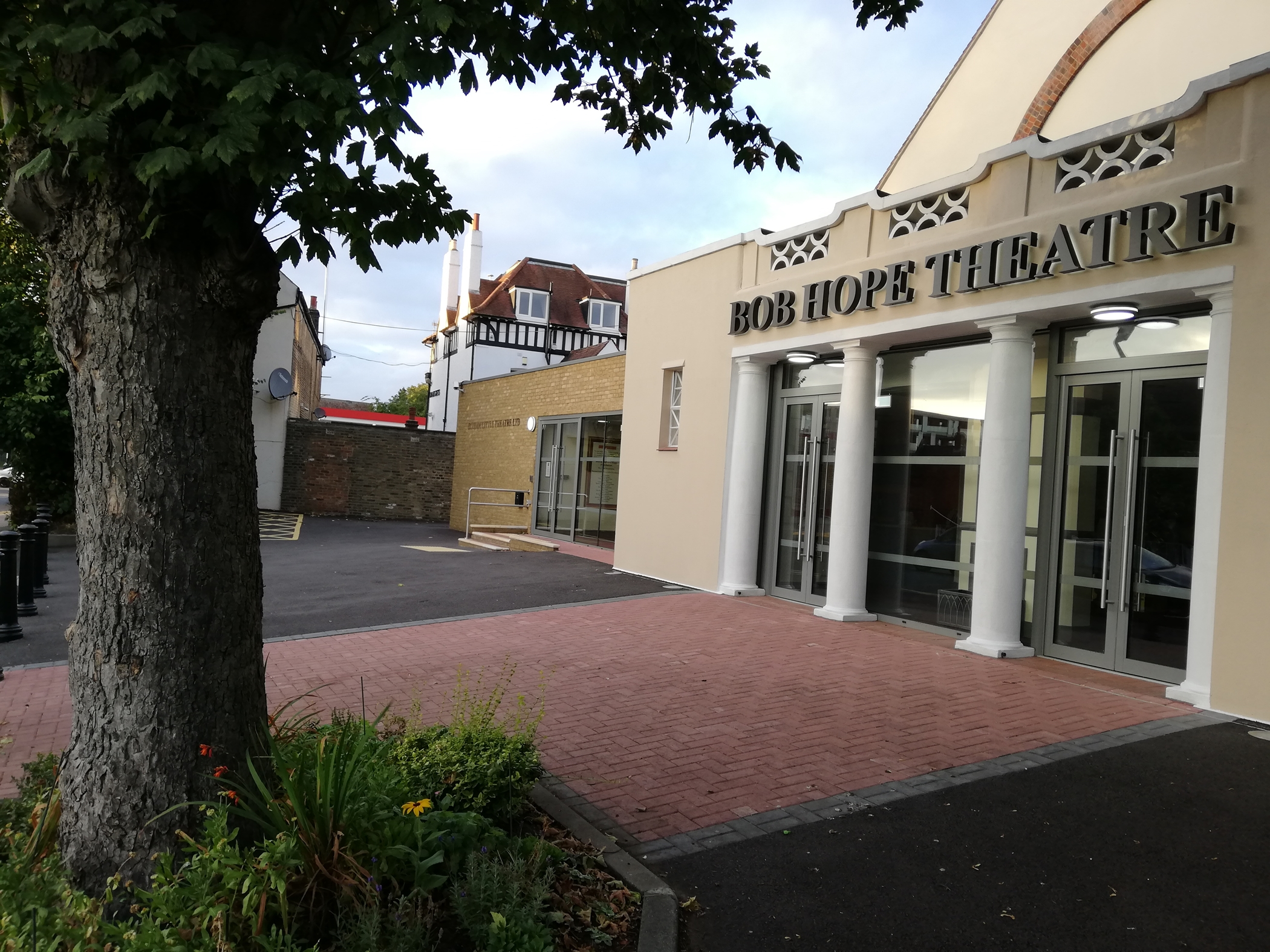
Exterior. Bob Hope Theatre, Eltham

The Bob Hope Theatre is a community theatre in Eltham in the Royal Borough of Greenwich, England. The theatre is owned and run by the members of Eltham Little Theatre Company. The theatre's own repertory members present approximately 11 shows each year, including a pantomime every January, and an annual musical. A variety of other companies also perform at the theatre throughout the year – about 15 additional productions.

== History ==
Eltham Little Theatre (ELT) Company was formed on 12 November 1943, to promote drama, music and allied arts in Eltham and its immediate vicinity. During the early years, it was without a permanent home but early in 1946, ELT was able to arrange an annual lease on Eltham Parish Hall (the current theatre). Eltham Parish Hall (built in 1910) was unavailable earlier as it was being used as a military furniture store for the duration of the Second World War.

During the period from 1948 to 1950 there were some 600 individual members and 25 affiliated societies, and a production was staged every other weekend throughout the season.

Throughout this time, the theatre's management aimed eventually to purchase the building. Members were continually engaged in fund-raising activities to that end. By 1957, however, it became apparent that the asking price was beyond reach, and a sub-committee memorandum was submitted to the Borough Council with a recommendation that the building be acquired as an artistic centre for Eltham. While rejecting the recommendation, the council awarded the theatre a grant in aid, towards running expenses, in the sum of £150. This grant, increased to keep step with inflation, continued until the 1980s.

The Bob Hope Theatre is a member of the Little Theatre Guild of Great Britain.

== Bob Hope intervention ==
During the late 1970s, several commercial concerns expressed an interest in the building for such purposes as a video recording studio, a sports centre and a multi-entertainment complex. None of these came to fruition for one reason or another. However, in 1979, the owner of the theatre wanted to sell the land and so would not renew the lease and without funds to find another base, members were widely resigned to the closure of both the building and the company.

By chance, Bob Hope, who was born in Craigton Road, Eltham, was in the UK to promote the Bob Hope British Classic Golf Tournament when he heard about the plight of the theatre.

Hope resolved to do what he could to help, and raised £58,000 through the 1980 and 1981 golf tournaments.

Hope was assisted by celebrity friends in fund-raising for the theatre. While negotiations for the purchase of the building continued, Dickie Henderson (vice-chairman of the Bob Hope British Golf Classic) gave a benefit performance of his one-man show at the theatre to raise funds towards refurbishment. This was a tremendous evening of entertainment, enhanced by the presence in the audience of several star personalities, including Max Wall.

In November 1982, the purchase of the freehold was completed and Eltham Little Theatre was renamed The Bob Hope Theatre.

In September 1982, Hope became co-honorary president of Eltham Little Theatre Company along with former President of the United States Gerald Ford, who was heavily involved with the Bob Hope Classic Golf Tournament.

In August 1991, Hope donated £28,000 from the benefit performance he staged at the London Palladium to raise money directly for the theatre.

== Famous alumni ==
- Frankie Howerd - Although never a member of Eltham Little Theatre, he was a member of one of the groups that came together to found Eltham Little Theatre and performed at Eltham Parish Hall. Howerd was a much loved British actor and comedian
- John Ayldon - An operatic bass-baritone and former member of the D'Oyly Carte Opera Company.
- Jude Law - Film actor.
