= The Waiting Room (2007 film) =

- Directed by: Roger Goldby
- Starring: Anne-Marie Duff; Frank Finlay; Ralf Little
- Production company: Bright Pictures
- Release date: 2007
- Running time: 1h 46m
- Country: United Kingdom
- Language: English

The Waiting Room is a 2007 British romantic drama film directed by Roger Goldby and starring Anne-Marie Duff, Frank Finlay, Ralf Little and Rupert Graves. It was produced by Bright Pictures, co-funded by the EU Creative Media fund, and distributed by Lionsgate.

The story follows three south London couples who try to come to terms with their love lives. A chance encounter at a London train station brings Anna, a lone parent, and Stephen, a care worker together. Their fateful meeting with an old man who was waiting for his wife at the station acts as a catalyst for them to examine what is going on in their different relationships. Music was by Edmund Butt.

== Cast ==
- Anne-Marie Duff - Anna
- Frank Finlay - Roger
- Rupert Graves - George
- Adrian Bower - Toby
- Daisy Donovan - Penny
- Ralf Little - Stephen
- Phyllida Law - Helen
- Zoe Telford - Jem
- Christine Bottomley - Fiona
- Leader Hawkins - Frank
- Peggy Batchelor - Doris
- Polly Rose McCarthy - Charlie
- Elizabeth Perry - Lady with Pram
- Lizzy McInnerny - Fiona's Mum
- Allan Corduner - Fiona's Dad
- Lee Williams - Brian
- Lottie Birdsall - Football Girl
- Kate Conway - Emily's Mum
- Finlay Kenny Tighe - Joe
- Paul Popplewell - Van driver
- Natalie Danks-Smith - Laura
