= Little Theatre Guild of Great Britain =

- Little Theatre Guild of Great Britain
- Founded: 18 May 1946
- Location: United Kingdom
- Key people: Joseph Millson (Patron); Nick Morley (Chair); Brian Stoner (Treasurer)
- Affiliations: Central Council for Amateur Theatre, Voluntary Arts Network
- Website: LittleTheatreGuild.org

The Little Theatre Guild of Great Britain (LTG) is an Umbrella organisation promoting and supporting independent amateur theatre companies which have control over their own premises and produce drama of a high quality for the benefit of their communities. It has been credited with being pivotal in securing recognition for the theatrical contribution of little theatres in the United Kingdom.

== History ==
The Little Theatre Guild, was founded in 1946 to represent the views of Amateur theatres across the UK. Its original membership was nine with groups such as The Crescent Theatre, Highbury Little Theatre and The Questors taking a leading part in its foundation. By 1988 this had increased to 30 and by 2010 to 103 theatre companies, some of which are outside the UK. The major restriction for membership is that it is open only to those amateur theatres that own or lease the theatre premises upon which productions are mounted.

Similar to the National Drama Festivals Association, the LTG organises festivals of amateur drama across the United Kingdom.

== Aims of the Guild ==
The aims of the Guild are:

- To extend close co-operation between members in all areas of theatre; to organise national and regional conferences and seminars.
- To run regular courses to improve standards and theatrical knowledge.
- To act as the co-ordinating body for the development of little theatres, and to lobby on their behalf on matters of national interest, such as Taxation, Charity status, licensing, sponsorship, insurance and royalties.
- To help and improve relationships with local authorities and regional arts associations.
- To provide a forum for the exchange of ideas regionally, nationally and internationally.
- To ensure that the voice of the little theatre movement is heard strongly within national and international bodies, including the Central Council for Amateur Theatre (CCAT) and the International Theatre Exchange (ITE).

The Guild holds two National Conferences each year and is organised on a regional basis for the arrangement of additional conferences, seminars and training events.

== Members ==
The Location of the member theatres of the Little Theatre Guild (excluding overseas members)
Northern Region
Central Region
Southern Region

The Guild is made up of 126 independent theatres (as of June 2026). These members are administered in four regions— Northern, Central, Southern and Overseas. The founding members of the guild included:

- Bradford Civic Playhouse, Bradford
- Crescent Theatre, Birmingham
- Great Hucklow Players, Derbyshire
- Highbury Little Theatre, Birmingham
- Leicester Drama Society, Leicester
- Norwich Players, Norwich
- People's Theatre, Newcastle Upon Tyne
- The Questors Theatre, London
- The Un-named Society, London

Some of these theatres have undergone name changes since they were formed and some have been dissolved.

Other notable members include:

- Archway Theatre – Surrey
- Bournemouth Little Theatre – Bournemouth
- Bromley Little Theatre – Bromley Kent/South-London
- The Bob Hope Theatre – Eltham, South-London
- Hall Green Little Theatre - Birmingham
- Ilkley Playhouse – Bradford
- Priory Theatre – Warwickshire
- Progress Theatre – Reading
- South London Theatre – South Norwood, London
- Station Theatre – Hampshire
- Rugby Theatre – Warwickshire
