= New Victoria Theatre =

Theatre in Woking, England

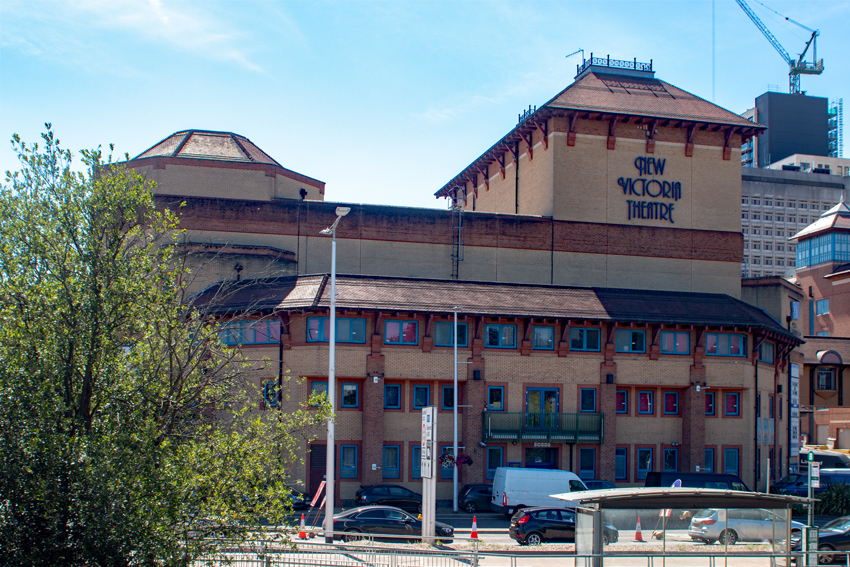
- Exterior of the theatre

- Location within Surrey
- Address: Peacocks Centre; Woking
- Coordinates: 51°19′14″N 0°33′35″W
- Owner: Ambassador Theatre Group
- Capacity: 1,300 (seated)
- Type: Theatre

Construction
- Opened: 1992
- Years active: 1992 - present

Website
- New Victoria Theatre website at Ambassador Theatre Group

The New Victoria Theatre in Woking, England opened in June 1992. The main theatre seats approximately 1,300 people, making it one of the largest receiving house theatres outside London. In addition to the main theatre the complex also contains the smaller Rhoda McGaw Theatre and a six-screen cinema. The theatre has presented dramas from groups such as the Royal Shakespeare Company, Royal National Theatre and the Peter Hall Company; regular visitors also include Glyndebourne on Tour, Scottish Ballet and Northern Ballet Theatre.

Large-scale musicals have included the award-winning Carmen Jones, Chicago, Cats and Miss Saigon, whilst the comedies, rock & roll musicals, children's shows and a Christmas pantomime are regular features in the theatre's programme.

The theatre is split into three levels: Stalls, Royal Circle and Upper Circle, with the Royal Circle and Stalls having disabled seating available. The first three rows of the stalls (AA, BB, and CC) are removed if space is needed for an orchestra pit.

== See also ==
- Rhoda McGaw Theatre
