= National Drama Festivals Association =

- National Drama Festivals Association Logo
- Location: Location of British All Winners Festival varies
- Founded: 1964
- Founded by: National Drama Festivals Association
- Type of plays: Full length and One Act Festivals
- Festival date: British All Winners Festival - July; Participating festivals - year-round
- Website: Official website

The National Drama Festivals Association (NDFA) was formed in 1964 to encourage and support amateur theatre, in particular through the organisation of drama festivals in the United Kingdom.

Since 1974 the NDFA has organised the British All Winners Drama Festival (BAWF) where the best of British amateur theatre take part in a week-long celebration of theatre. The winners of all NDFA member festivals in the previous year, including full-length or one-act member festivals, are eligible for invitation to take part.

The NDFA sponsors two playwriting competitions - the George Taylor Memorial Award and the Nan Nuttall Memorial Awards. The objective of this competition is to promote new writing for the theatre. Adjudication is carried out by a panel of judges, and the winners receive a certificate and a cash prize.

Membership of the NDFA is open to all drama festival organisations, theatre groups and individuals who are interested in supporting drama festivals in the UK.

== British All Winners Drama Festival ==
=== Awards ===
There are a number of awards presented at the British All Winners Drama Festival which include:

- FULL LENGTH PLAYS
  - OVERALL WINNER - The Mary Blakeman Trophy
  - RUNNER UP - The Amateur Stage Trophy
  - ADJUDICATOR'S AWARD - The Felixstowe Festival Trophy
  - BACKSTAGE AWARD - The Sydney Fisher Trophy
- ONE ACT PLAYS
  - OVERALL WINNER - The Irving Trophy
  - RUNNER UP - The NDFA Council Trophy
  - ADJUDICATOR'S AWARD - The Amateur Theatre Trophy
  - BACKSTAGE AWARD - The Sydney Fisher Trophy
  - AUDIENCE APPRECIATION - Halifax Evening Courier Award
- YOUTH ENTRY
  - WINNER OF YOUTH SECTION - The NDFA Trophy
  - YOUTH PARTICIPATION AWARD - The Buxton Trophy
  - YOUTH AUDIENCE APPRECIATION - The GADOC Joyce Cook Memorial Trophy

=== Results ===
Number	Year	One Act Plays				Full Length Plays				Venue	Location	Adjudicator
Number	Year	Winners (Irving Trophy)	Nationality	Runners Up (NDFA Council Trophy)	Nationality	Winners (Mary Blakeman Trophy)	Nationality	Runners Up (Amateur Stage Trophy)	Nationality	Venue	Location	Adjudicator
39th	2012	Runnymede Drama Group (A Kind of Alaska by Harold Pinter )	ENG	Entity Theatre Company ("Three Nights with Madox" by Matei Visniec)	ENG	Halifax Thespians (Someone Who'll Watch Over Me by Frank McGuinness)	ENG	Legion Players ("April in Paris" by John Godber)	ENG	Thwaites Empire Theatre	Blackburn	Russell Whiteley GoDA
38th	2011	Prometheus Theatre Company ("Tape" by Stephen Belber)	ENG	GADOC ("Effie's Burning" by Valerie Windsor)	ENG	FissiParous Theatre ("Stones in His Pockets" by Marie Jones)	ENG	Whole Hog Productions ("Metamorphosis" by Steven Berkoff)	ENG	Beau Sejour Theatre and the Princess Royal Performing Arts Centre	St Peter Port, Guernsey, Channel Islands	Tony Rushforth GoDA
37th	2010	GADOC (“Life Lines” by Amy Rosenthal)	ENG	St Ursula Players (“The Invisible Man” by Jennifer Johnson)	ENG	The Heath Players (“The Sociable Plover" by Tim Whitnall)	ENG	Stafford Players (“Humble Boy” by Charlotte Jones)	ENG	The Thameside Theatre	Grays, Essex	Paul Fowler GoDA
36th	2009	Karvid Productions - Hemel Hempstead (Alas Poor Fred by James Saunders)	ENG	The Lighted Fools Theatre Company (The Dumb Waiter by Harold Pinter)	ENG	Bejou Productions (Someone Who'll Watch Over Me by Frank McGuinness)	ENG	Horncastle Theatre Company (The Accrington Pals by Peter Whelan)	ENG	Rhoda McGaw Theatre	Woking	Mike Kaiser GoDA
35th	2008	Send ADS - Surrey (The Island by Athol Fugard)	ENG	St.Pauls Drama Group - Surrey (Happy Jack by John Godber)	ENG	Everyman Productions - Co Sligo (Juno and the Paycock by Seán O'Casey)	IRE	Wakefield Little Theatre - Yorks (Death of a Salesman by Arthur Miller)	ENG	The Gaiety Theatre	Douglas, Isle of Man	Colin Dolley GoDA
34th	2007	Woking College Theatre Company (Home Free by Landford Wilson)	ENG	Lightnin' Drama Group (Circus of Life by Sue Ospreay)	ENG	Bejou Productions (Art by Yasmina Reza (translated by Christopher Hampton))	ENG	The Lamproom Theatre, Barnsley (Turns by John Kelly)	ENG	Albert Hall Theatre	Llandrindod Wells	Scott Marshall GODA
33rd	2006	Barn Theatre Club (Marry Me a Little by Stephen Sondheim)	ENG	Runnymede Drama Group (And Go To Innisfree by Jean Lenox Toddie)	ENG	Belvoir players (Someone Who'll Watch Over Me by Frank McGuinness)	NIR	Cytringan Players ('night, Mother by Marsha Norman)	ENG	Rhoda McGaw Theatre	Woking	Mike Tilbury GODA
32nd	2005	Pump House Theatre (April in Paris by John Godber)	ENG	( )	TBC	( )	TBC	( )	TBC	The Halifax Playhouse	Halifax, West Yorkshire	Russell Whiteley GODA
31st	2004	Leonic Players (A Conversation of Sorts by Les Littlewood)	ENG	New World Theatre Club, Luxembourg (Footprints in the Sand by Colin Crowther)	LUX	In Yer Space (The Woman Who Cooked Her Husband by Debbie Isitt)	ENG	Halifax Thespians (The Salvage Shop by Jim Nolan)	ENG	Albert Hall Theatre	Llandrindod Wells	Scott Marshall GODA
30th	2003	Bovingdon Players (Hertfordshire) (“Me and My Friend” (act ii) by Gillian Plowman)	ENG	BAWDS (Cambridge) (North of Boston by Robert Frost)	ENG	The Lamproom Theatre Company (Barnsley, S Yorks) (Up 'n' Under by John Godber)	ENG	In yer space (Preston, Lancs) (A Night in November by Marie Jones)	ENG	Forest Arts Centre	New Milton, Hants	Tony Rushforth GODA
29th	2002	Runnymede Drama Group (Five Kinds of Silence by Shelagh Stephenson)	ENG	The Bradford Players Theatre Co. (Jam by Graham Fife)	ENG	Everyman Productions (The Mai by Marina Carr)	IRE	Chelmsford Theatre Workshop (Nunsense by Dan Goggin)	ENG	Castle Hall, The Wash	Hertford	Scott Marshall GODA
28th	2001	Pump House Theatre Company (Home Free by Lanford Wilson)	ENG	Storrington Theatre Workshop (The Room by Harold Pinter)	ENG	Sudbury Dramatic Society (Twelve Angry Men by Reginald Rose)	ENG	Cardiff Players (Communicating Doors by Alan Ayckbourn)	WAL	Rhoda McGaw Theatre	Woking	Mike Tilbury GODA
27th	2000	Runnymede Drama Group (Scarecrow by Don Nigro)	ENG	Wilstead Players (Porch by Jack Heifner)	ENG	Brigstowe Theatre Company (Entertaining Mr Sloane by Joe Orton)	ENG	Thurrock Courts Players (Neville's Island by Tim Firth)	ENG	Spa Pavilion Theatre	Felixstowe	Jeannie Russell GODA
26th	1999	East Essex Players (Laughter In the Shadow of the Trees by John Prideaux)	ENG	Bovingdon Players (A Coupla White Chicks Sitting Around Talking by John Ford Noonan)	ENG	Enniscorthy Theatre Group (The Cripple of Inishmaan by Martin McDonagh)	IRE	Deben Players (Key for Two by John Chapman and Dave Freeman)	ENG	Thameside Theatre	Grays	Rex Walford GODA
20th	1993										Porthcawl	
4th	1977										Buxton	
