= Barn Theatre, Welwyn Garden City =

Theatre in Welwyn Garden City, Hertfordshire, England

Barn Theatre
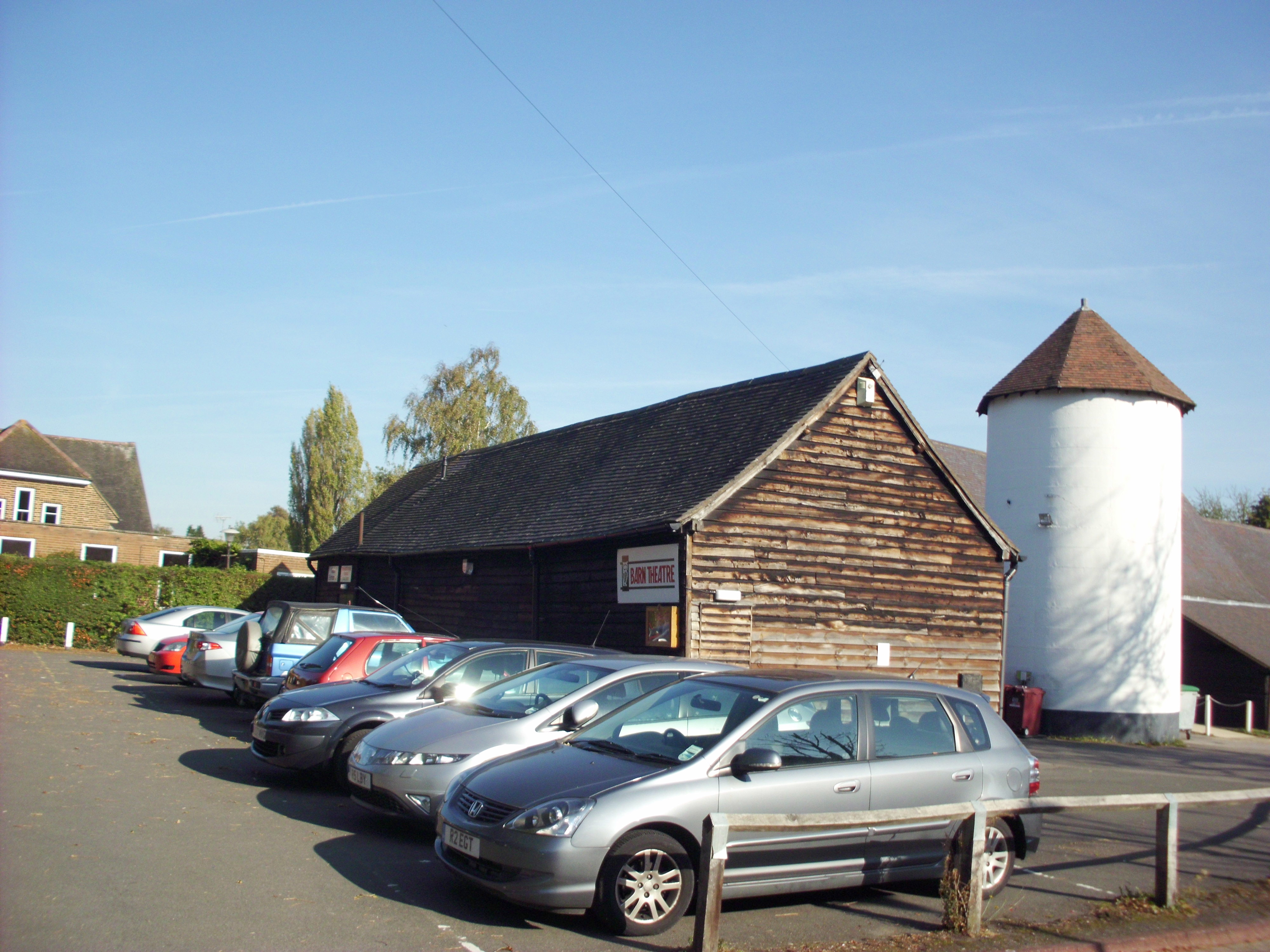

- Barn Theatre on the map of Hertfordshire
- Address: Barn Close; Welwyn Garden City AL8 6ST
- Location: Welwyn Garden City, United Kingdom
- Coordinates: 51.7984°N 0.2150°W
- Owner: Barn Theatre Trust
- Seating type: Seated auditorium
- Capacity: 121
- Type: Theatre
- Designation

Listed Building – Grade II
- Official name: The Barn Theatre
- Designated: 4 November 1980
- Reference no.: 1348120
- Public transit: Welwyn Garden City

Construction
- Opened: January 1932

Website
- www.barntheatre.co.uk

The Barn Theatre, located in Welwyn Garden City, England is a Grade II listed, 17th-century timber-framed barn converted to a community theatre in 1931.

It is owned by The Barn Theatre Trust and used by a local amateur theatre company, The Barn Theatre Club. It has two performance spaces: a main auditorium and a studio.

== History ==
The original barn or barns that form the current building were constructed from timbers dated to 1597 by dendrochronology in 2014, most probably sourced from nearby Sherrardspark Wood.

The building in its current form was constructed on its present site on Handside Lane in or around 1830, as part of Lower Handside Farm.

It was converted from a cowshed to a theatre in 1931 and opened in January 1932. In 1969 the Barn Theatre Club was formed from the combined Welwyn Drama Club and Welwyn Folk Players.

The building was Grade II listed on 4 November 1980 and bought by the Barn Theatre Trust in 1984.

== Building ==
There are two performance areas:

- a raked 121-seat auditorium, refurbished in 2016
- a smaller, flexible studio, extended and refurbished in 2014

The building also houses a bar, green room, dressing rooms, rehearsal space, workshop, and properties and costume stores.

== Use of the building ==
The resident theatre company, The Barn Theatre Club, presents monthly productions in the main auditorium and other shows in the studio, alongside other community and club events. The club also participates in theatre festivals and provides basic youth theatre training.

The venue also hosts the annual Welwyn Drama Festival (since 2015) and Welwyn Garden City Youth Drama Festival.

The building was also used as a film location for Hot Fuzz.
