= Bournemouth Little Theatre Club =

- Interactive map of Bournemouth Little Theatre Club
- Coordinates: 50.74763°N 1.8788401°W

Website
- www.bournemouthlittletheatre.co.uk

Bournemouth Little Theatre Club (BLTC) was founded in 1919 as The Bournemouth Dramatic and Orchestral Club and is the oldest amateur drama club in the Bournemouth / Poole / Christchurch area.

The club stages 6 to 8 productions (dramas, thrillers, comedies, and farces) a year, and is the only local group with its own dedicated premises on Jameson Road in Winton, Bournemouth.

== History ==
=== Early years ===
In the 1920s a private company was formed which raised enough funds for the building of the club's own custom-designed, 450-seat theatre in Hinton Road which was opened in 1931 as The Little Theatre (later changed to The Palace Court Theatre). So great was the use of the premises that permanent paid staff were employed on a full-time basis to do those important but under-appreciated tasks that most amateur actors hate to do - taking bookings, managing the building, constructing sets, running the very active bar, and cleaning the place.

The sponsoring company, Bournemouth Little Theatre Ltd., paid £3,000 for the Land, £15,000 in construction costs, £1,600 for furnishings and fittings and £840 in preliminary expenses (incorporation, stamp duty and financial costs). Altogether the start up costs were £20,440, financed by equal amounts of debentures at 6% and preference shares. There were perhaps 546 seats at one time.

Inevitably, World War II affected social activities but the Club remained in business, and resumed in full flight after hostilities ceased. By the mid-1950s the picture was one of seasons packed full of productions by the club, professional shows, basement starter plays, morning teas and coffees on the Club premises. The club was, in fact, so successful that a limit of 1500 had to be placed on membership.

=== The Middle Years ===
In the 1960s it proved increasingly difficult for the club to meet the ever-escalating running costs of its premises. In 1970 the decision was taken to sell the building, and the sale was completed in 1971 providing the club with a modest fund of cash to back its future activities.

The Club then moved to a location in Bournemouth town centre that proved too small for the staging of plays but which served as a useful base from which to conduct a touring programme, taking live theatre to many towns and villages in the vicinity.

In 1975 BLTC found itself a new home in Jameson Road, Winton where it was lucky to secure the upper floor of an industrial building at a low rent. The property was originally designed during the 1930s for use as the staff canteen area of the garage below. Over the years since 1975, a continuous series of alterations has adapted the original, rather stark premises into today's intimate theatre. The auditorium has a capacity of 95 seats, there is an area for serving interval teas and coffees behind the auditorium and a corridor leads to the Green Room Bar and other facilities.

The Club adopted its present name in 1992, when it formed itself into a private company limited by guarantee, and also achieved charitable status.

=== Modern times ===
In 1999 it looked as if BLTC would, once more, lose its theatre, for the club was annually in the red to the tune of about £4,000 - sometimes playing to a capacity of only 30%. But the club decided to fight back by active marketing, the build of an accurate database of patrons and regular mail shots. A raked auditorium (with tip-up seats) was built in 2000 and a newsletter developed which was sent (bi monthly) to both members and non-members.

Recently the club has become a member of the Little Theatre Guild of Great Britain.

It is a regular winner of Curtain Call awards - the local 'Oscars' awarded annually by the Bournemouth Daily Echo.
