= Belvoir players =

Belvoir Players Amateur Dramatics Society is situated in Belvoir Drive, Belfast and was founded in 1968. Richard Mills, is the current chairman of the company. They are responsible for such works as the play version of Joseph Tomelty's The Mcooeys.

In 2005 Belvoir Players won the Full-Length British Festival, sweeping the award boards. In 2006, the company took three awards at the Ulster Drama Festival.

The society has a Junior and Senior Group and was Opened in July 2001 and has been the Fortress of Belvoir ever since. The Junior Society has a massive 176 members with a waiting list to gain membership.
