= Gillian Plowman =

English playwright

Gillian Plowman is an English playwright. She is the author of more than 20 plays. She won the 1988 Verity Bargate Award for her play Me and My Friend. Originally staged at the Soho Poly, it was later revived at the Chichester Festival and at the Orange Tree Theatre. In 2008, the Oval House Theatre staged her play Yours Abundantly, From Zimbabwe. "Yours Abundantly" has been published in the 2013 anthology; Plays for Today by Women.

Plowman is a patron of the Royal Air Force Theatrical Association, along with Sir Peter Hall, Sir Frederick Sowrey, Stephen Daldry and Ben Humphrey.
