= Don Nigro =

American playwright (1949–2026)

- Born: September 30, 1949; Canton, Ohio, U.S.
- Died: February 9, 2026 (aged 76); Canton, Ohio, U.S.
- Education: Ohio State University, Columbus (BA); University of Iowa (MFA)
- Occupation: Playwright

Don Joseph Nigro (September 30, 1949 – February 9, 2026) was an American playwright. His plays Anima Mundi and The Dark Sonnets of the Lady have both been nominated for the National Repertory Theatre Foundation's National Play Award. He won a Playwright's Fellowship Grant from the National Endowment for the Arts (NEA), grants from the Mary Roberts Rinehart Foundation and the Ohio Arts Council, and was twice James Thurber Writer In Residence at the Thurber House in Columbus, Ohio.

== Background ==
Don Nigro was born on September 30, 1949, and, in later life, lived near Malvern, Ohio. He grew up in Ohio and Arizona.

He received a Bachelor of Arts in English from Ohio State University in 1971 and a Master of Fine Arts in dramatic arts from the Playwrights Workshop at the University of Iowa in 1979. At various times he has taught at the Ohio State University, the University of Massachusetts Amherst, Indiana State University, the University of Iowa, and Kent State University.

Nigro listed some of his major dramatic influences as Shakespeare and the Jacobeans, Samuel Beckett, Harold Pinter, Peter Barnes, Tom Stoppard, and the early work of John Arden and Edward Bond. He lists his major non-dramatic influences as the work of William Butler Yeats, James Joyce, T. S. Eliot, William Faulkner, Ford Madox Ford, Marcel Proust and Jorge Luis Borges. He also lists the King James Bible, Buster Keaton, and the Marx Brothers.

Nigro died on February 9, 2026, at the age of 76.

== Career ==
Nigro wrote more than 500 plays, 201 of which have been published by Samuel French, Inc. in 58 volumes. Also 226 of his plays in 75 volumes are available in manuscript form on the Samuel French web site, and 13 of his plays in 5 volumes are published by Next Stage Press. One of his plays, Ravenscroft, was adapted into the film The Manor, with Peter O'Toole.

His long cycle of Pendragon County plays, now numbering well over two dozen and still growing, traces American history from the eighteenth century to the present through the lives of several generations of interconnected families from an east Ohio town. These include Glamorgan, Horrid Massacre In Boston, Armitage, Fisher King, Green Man, Sorceress, Tristan, Pendragon, Chronicles, Anima Mundi, Beast With Two Backs, Laestrygonians, The Circus Animals' Desertion, Dramatis Personae, The Reeves Tale and November.

His cycle of Russian plays includes Pushkin, Gogol, An Angler In The Lake Of Darkness (about Leo Tolstoy), Emotion Memory (about Anton Chekhov), A Russian Play, Rasputin, and Mandelstam.

His plays about art and artists include Hieronymus Bosch, Dutch Interiors (about Vermeer), Blood Red Roses (about the Pre-Raphaelites), The Daughters of Edward D. Boit (based on the painting by John Singer Sargent), Netherlands (about Van Gogh), Sphinx (about Franz Von Stuck), Madonna (about Edvard Munch), Europe After The Rain (about Max Ernst), Picasso (about the invisible squirrel in a painting by Braque), and City of Dreadful Night, (inspired by the paintings of Edward Hopper).

His Inspector Ruffing plays include Mephisto, Demonology, The Rooky Wood, Creatures Lurking In The Churchyard, Ravenscroft, Widdershins, and Phantoms.

Other plays include Machiavelli, Ardy Fafirsin, A Lecture By Monsieur Artaud (about Antonin Artaud), Grotesque Lovesongs (originally commissioned by producer Saint Subber), Mariner (about Christopher Columbus), Jules Verne Eats A Rhinoceros (about reporter Nellie Bly), Punch and Judy, Boar's Head (about the lives of the supporting characters at the Boar's Head Inn in Shakespeare's mentioned but unwritten scenes from his Henry IV plays), Loves Labours Wonne (about Shakespeare), Paganini, Lucia Mad (about the daughter of James Joyce), Cinderella Waltz, Specter, Monkey Soup, Don Giovanni, The Count of Monte Cristo In The Chateau D'If, Quint And Miss Jessel At Bly, The Girlhood Of Shakespeare's Heroines, Terre Haute, The Transylvanian Clockworks, Seascape With Sharks and Dancer, Henry And Ellen (about Henry Irving and Ellen Terry), The Dark Sonnets Of The Lady (about Sigmund Freud and his patient Dora), Seduction (inspired by Søren Kierkegaard's Diary of a Seducer), Rainy Night At Lindy's (about the last night of gangster Arnold Rothstein), What Shall I Do For Pretty Girls? (about the tangled relationship of William Butler Yeats to Maud Gonne, her daughter Iseult Gonne, and Yeats' automatic writing wife Georgie Hyde-Lees), Maelstrom (about Edgar Allan Poe), Traitors (about the Alger Hiss-Whittaker Chambers case) and My Sweetheart's the Man in the Moon (about Evelyn Nesbit and Stanford White).

He is also known for his cult work The Curate Shakespeare As You Like It, subtitled Being the record of one company's attempt to perform the play by William Shakespeare.

Martian Gothic was commissioned by The Ensemble Studio Theatre in New York as part of the Alfred P. Sloan Foundation Science & Technology Project and developed earlier at the McCarter Theatre in Princeton.

Nigro's plays have been produced at the McCarter Theatre, Actors Theatre of Louisville, the Oregon Shakespeare Festival, the WPA Theatre, the Hudson Guild Theatre, Capital Repertory Company, the New York Fringe Festival, the Berkeley Stage Company, Manhattan Class Company, the People's Light And Theatre Company, the Milwaukee Repertory Theatre, Theatre X, the Secret Rose Theatre, Inertia Productions, the Hypothetical Theatre, the Idaho Shakespeare Festival, the Oldcastle Theatre, the Porthouse Theatre, the Old Creamery Theatre, the Sacramento Theatre Company, the Strain Theatre Company, the Apothecary Theatre Company, Gravity and Glass, Theatre NXS, Renaissance Theatreworks, Look At The Fish Theatre Company, at Teatr Syrena in Warsaw, Teatr Julius Slowakie in Kraków, toured in Germany by the Munich-based company SpielArt, at the First International Mystery Festival, toured in India, in London, Munich, Mexico City, Singapore, Australia, New Zealand, Italy, Spain, Switzerland, Lithuania, Estonia, Latvia, Norway, Finland, Ukraine, Belarus, Belgium, Moldova, Slovenia, South Africa, Tehran, Hong Kong and Beijing. John Clancy's production of Cincinnati, with Nancy Walsh, won Fringe First and Spirit of the Fringe awards at the Edinburgh Fringe Festival, and Best of Fringe at the Adelaide Fringe Festival in Australia, and later toured in England and Wales. His plays are frequently done by many Off Off Broadway companies in New York, and in Kyiv, Odesa, Mykolaiv, and other cities in Ukraine during the war with Russia. In 2024 three of his plays, Ravenscroft, Maddalena and Animal Tales, were being performed by the repertory company at the Chekhov Theatre in Chisinau, Moldova, in the translations of Victor Weber, directed by Iosif Shats.

Nigro's plays have been translated into Italian, French, German, Spanish, Ukrainian, Bulgarian, Russian, Greek, Polish, Dutch, Lithuanian and Chinese.

In November 2012 a Spanish version of Seascape With Sharks And Dancer, translated by Tato Alexander and featuring Bruno Bichir and Tato Alexander, opened at Teatro El Granero in Mexico City. This production was revived in Mexico City in 2013 and later toured in Mexico.

In June 2013 Marina and Mata Hari were produced in New York by Nylon Fusion Theatre Company, both featuring actress Tatyana Kot and directed by Ivette Dumeng. In 2015 Gorgons was produced by the Drama Theatre of Petrozavodsk and the Drama Theatre of Yelets, in Russia. In 2016 Don Giovanni was produced by the Yermolova Drama Theatre in Moscow, Gorgons at the Aggelon Vima Theatre in Athens, Greece, and Nebuchadnezzar at the Vene Theatre in Tallinn, Estonia.

The Jerome Lawrence and Robert E. Lee Theatre Research Institute at the Ohio State University in Columbus has archived a large collection of Nigro's scripts and related materials.

See also McGhee, Jim: Labyrinth: The Plays Of Don Nigro (University Press Of America, 2004).
