= Guild of Drama Adjudicators =

- Guild of Drama Adjudicators
- Founded: 1947
- Location: United Kingdom
- Key people: Patron - Sir Alan Ayckbourn Chairman - Jan Palmer Sayer; Vice Chairman - Jennifer Scott Reid; Hon. Secretary - Teresa Hennessy Hon. Treasurer - Peter Reiss
- Website: Official site

The Guild of Drama Adjudicators (GoDA) is the world's longest established body dedicated to the adjudication of all forms of theatre, both professional and amateur.

Full Members of the Guild are entitled to use the post-nominal letters, GoDA

Associate Members are entitled to use the post-nominal of GoDA(Associate)

== History ==
GoDA was founded in 1947 as a response to the growing dissatisfaction about standards of adjudication in the boom festival years after World War II with an editorial in the magazine Amateur Stage providing the impetus for its establishment. Ostensibly, it was founded for the benefit of Amateur Drama and from its beginnings its members were available to assist Amateur Dramatic Societies across the United Kingdom with constructive criticism both at Drama Festivals or at performances specific to individual groups.

To achieve its founding aims GoDA established recognised principles of practice for its members to apply and adhere to. The Guild also formulated definitive objectives to this end, namely:

- To supply qualified adjudicators to all organisations promoting amateur drama.
- To enable its members to work unfettered towards the objectives of the Guild.
- To provide opportunities for the discussion of the problems of adjudication and tuition either by schools, conferences, or by other means.

== Membership ==
There were originally forty-six founder members and, with a few exceptions, additional members are selected by means of annual Selection Weekends where candidates are instructed and tested. Candidates for membership must have had professional or amateur stage experience and demonstrate a thorough knowledge of drama (with many members engaged in teaching drama in some form). Over eighty per cent of members have had professional stage experience as actors, directors, or stage managers. Once accepted into the Guild, members are mentored for a period of two years before rising from Associate Members to Full Members with a minimum of six festivals having been adjudicated by them during that time. Even then, their admission is at the discretion of the GoDA Council, based upon confidential reports from two Festival Organisers by whom the Associate Member has been employed and an appraisal by two senior members of the Guild.

The scope of the activities of the members of the Guild range from adjudicating drama festivals for full plays, one-act plays, or verse-speaking festivals to lecturing on drama and various aspects of theatrical art. On occasion the Guild has been called upon to aid in the production of plays, operas and musicals. In terms of the geographic scope of the organisation, although based in the UK, the Guild provides services internationally if requested and have an international reputation for their work.

=== Current Full Members of the Guild ===
- Arthur Aldridge
- William Burns MBE
- Robert Clarke
- Sue Doherty * Council
- Alan Haslett
- Alan Hayes
- David Henson
- Ben Humphrey JP FRSA
- Chris Jaeger MBE FRSA
- Bev Jenkins* Council
- Michael Kaiser
- Louise Manders
- Scott Marshall
- Robert Meadows
- Ron Nicol
- Jan Palmer Sayer
- Michael Patterson
- Michael Poynor ADA [ Association of Drama Adjudicators ]
- David Price * Council
- Andrew Rawlinson
- Arthur Rochester
- Jeannie Russell
- Jennifer Scott-Reid FRSA
- Helen E Sharman
- Cherry Stephenson FRSA
- Keith Thompson * Current Chair
- David Vince
- Jim Wolstencroft
- Richard Woodward

=== Current Associate Members of the Guild ===
- Christopher Baglin
- Anna Beaney
- Dave Bennet
- Imelda Byrne
- Meryl Duff
- Frances Glynne
- Julie McLoughlin
- Keith Philips
- Joe Riley FRSA
- Nick Wilkes
- Sandra Wynne
