= Technology of television =

Telecommunications, sound and video

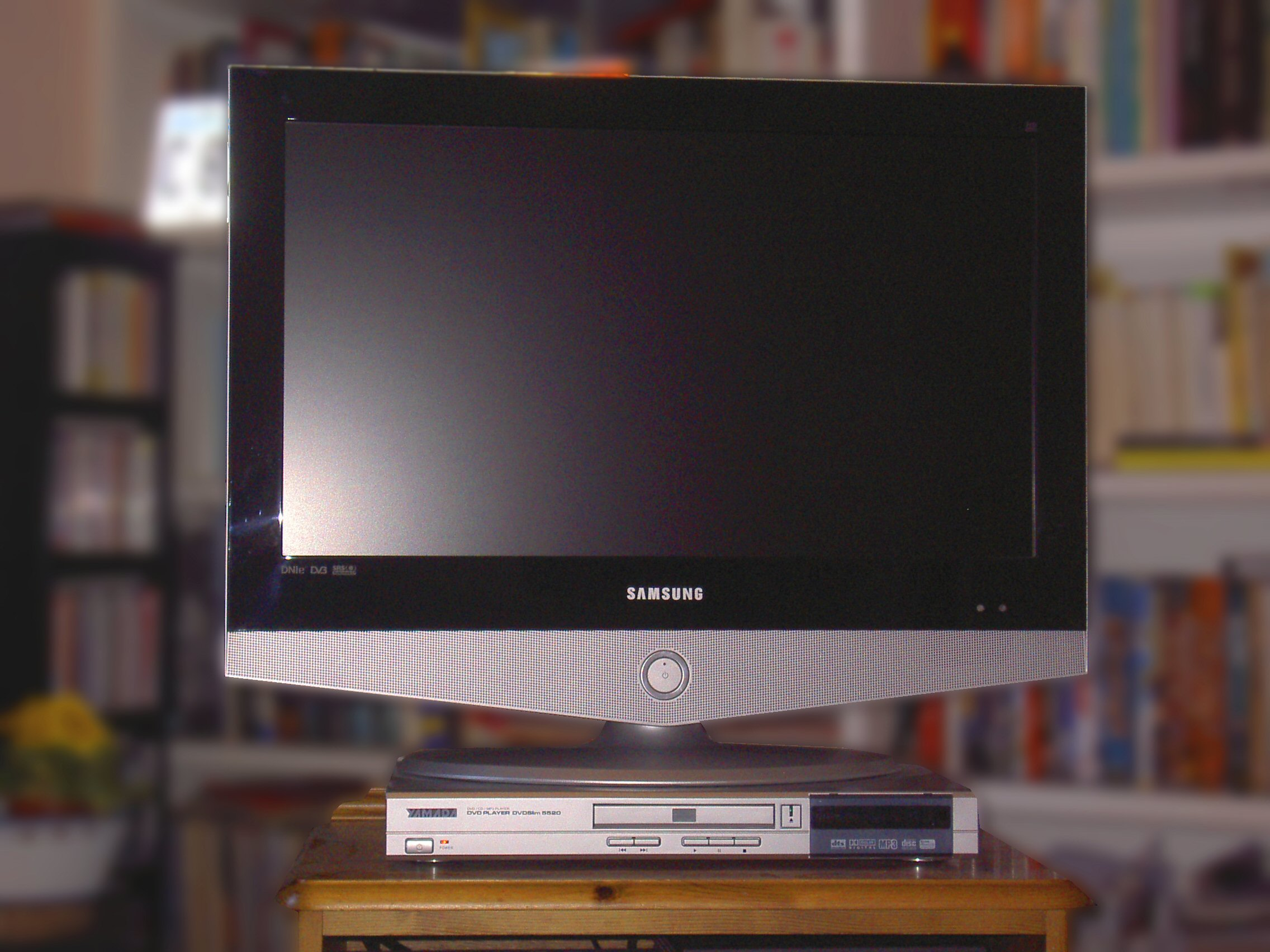
Samsung LE26R41BD and Yamada DVD player 20030624

The technology of television has evolved since its early days using a mechanical system invented by Paul Gottlieb Nipkow in 1884. Every television system works on the scanning principle first implemented in the rotating disk scanner of Nipkow. This turns a two-dimensional image into a time series of signals that represent the brightness and color of each resolvable element of the picture. By repeating a two-dimensional image quickly enough, the impression of motion can be transmitted as well. For the receiving apparatus to reconstruct the image, synchronization information is included in the signal to allow proper placement of each line within the image and to identify when a complete image has been transmitted and a new image is to follow.

While mechanically scanned systems were experimentally used, television as a mass medium was made practical by the development of electronic camera tubes and displays. By the turn of the 21st century, it was technically feasible to replace the analog signals for television broadcasting with digital signals. Many television viewers no longer use an antenna to receive over-the-air broadcasts, instead relying on cable television systems. Increasingly, these are integrated with telephone and Internet services.

== Elements of a television system ==
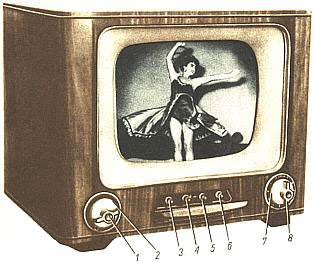
OT-1471 Belweder, Poland, 1957: 1. power switch and volume control; 2. brightness; 3. pitch; 4. vertical synchro; 5. horizontal synchro; 6. contrast; 7. channel tuning; 8. channel switch

The elements of a simple broadcast television system are:

- An image source. This is the electrical signal that represents a visual image, and may be derived from a professional video camera in the case of live television, a video tape recorder for playback of recorded images, or telecine with a flying spot scanner for the transfer of motion pictures to video).
- A sound source. This is an electrical signal from a microphone or from the audio output of a video tape recorder.
- A transmitter, which generates radio signals (radio waves) and encodes them with picture and sound information.
- A television antenna coupled to the output of the transmitter for broadcasting the encoded signals.
- A television antenna to receive the broadcast signals.
- A receiver (also called a tuner), which decodes the picture and sound information from the broadcast signals, and whose input is coupled to the antenna of the television set.
- A display device, which turns the electrical signals into visual images.
- An audio amplifier and loudspeaker, which turns electrical signals into sound waves (speech, music, and other sounds) to accompany the images.

Practical television systems include equipment for selecting different image sources, mixing images from several sources at once, insertion of pre-recorded video signals, synchronizing signals from many sources, and direct image generation by computer for such purposes as station identification. The facility for housing such equipment, as well as providing space for stages, sets, offices, etc., is called a television studio, and may be located many miles from the transmitter. Communication from the studio to the transmitter is accomplished via a dedicated cable or radio system.

Television signals were originally transmitted exclusively via land-based transmitters. The quality of reception varied greatly, dependent in large part on the location and type of receiving antenna. This led to the proliferation of large rooftop antennas to improve reception in the 1960s, replacing set-top dipole or "rabbit ears" antennas, which, however, remained popular. Antenna rotors, set-top controlled servo motors to which the mast of the antenna is mounted, to enable rotating the antenna such that it points to the desired transmitter, would also become popular.

In most cities today, cable television providers deliver signals over coaxial or fiber-optic cables for a fee. Signals can also be delivered by radio from satellites in geosynchronous orbit and received by parabolic dish antennas, which are comparatively large for analog signals, but much smaller for digital. Like cable providers, satellite television providers also require a fee, often less than cable systems. The affordability and convenience of digital satellite reception has led to the proliferation of small dish antennas outside many houses and apartments.

Digital systems may be inserted anywhere in the chain to provide better image transmission quality, reduction in transmission bandwidth, special effects, or security of transmission from reception by non-subscribers. A home today might have the choice of receiving analog or HDTV over the air, analog or digital cable with HDTV from a cable television company over coaxial cable, or even from the phone company over fiber optic lines. On the road, television can be received by pocket sized televisions, recorded on tape or digital media players, or played back on wireless phones (mobile or "cell" phones) over a high-speed or "broadband" internet connection.

== Display technology ==
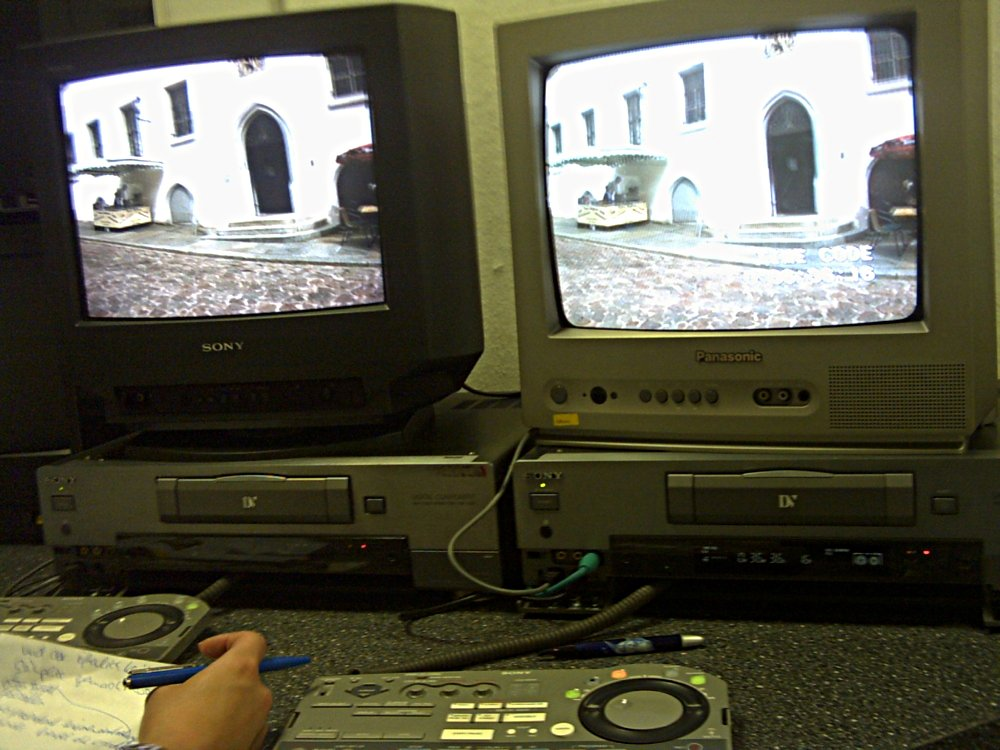
Digital video equipment in an edit suite

There are now several kinds of video displays used in modern TV sets:

- CRT (cathode-ray tube): Up until the first decade of the 21st century, the most common screens were direct-view CRTs for up to roughly 100 cm (40 inch) (in 4:3 ratio) and 115 cm (45 inch) (in 16:9 ratio) diagonals. A typical NTSC broadcast signal's visible portion has an equivalent resolution of 449 x 483 rectangular pixels.
- Rear Projection (RPTV) displays can be made in large sizes, (254 cm (100 inch) and beyond), and use projection technology. Three types of projection systems are used in projection TVs: CRT-based, LCD-based, and DLP (reflective micromirror chip) -based, D-ILA and LCOS-based. Projection television has been commercially available since the 1970s, but at that time could not match the image sharpness of the CRT.
  - A variation is a video projector, using similar technology, which projects onto a screen. This is often referred to as "front projection".
- Flat-panel display (LCD or plasma): Flat panels television sets use active matrix LCD or plasma display technology. Flat panel LCDs and plasma displays are as little as 25.4 mm thick and can be hung on a wall like a picture or put over a pedestal. Some models can also be used as computer monitors.
- LED (light-emitting diode) arrays (not to be confused with the LED backlighting used behind some LCD panels consequently advertised as "LED") became the favored technology for large outdoor video and stadium screens after the advent of very bright LEDs and the matrix driver electronics for them. They make possible ultra-large flat panel video displays that other technologies are currently not able to match in performance.
- OLED (organic light-emitting diode) technology is currently (2019) used in high-end smartphone screens and televisions. Unlike LCD panels, OLED screens are viewable from extreme angles, are free from pixel lag, and offer a very high contrast ratio comparable to CRT displays, with very deep blacks. They can be extremely thin and lightweight and can, at least in prototype, be made flexible enough to roll up when not in use.

Each has its pros and cons. Front projection and plasma displays have a wide viewing angle (nearly 180 degrees) so they may be best for a home theater with a wide seating arrangement. Rear projection screens do not perform well in daylight or well-lit rooms and so are only suitable for darker viewing areas.

== Terminology and specifications ==
Display resolution is the number of pixels of one row on a given screen. Before the year 2000 horizontal lines of resolution was the standard method of measurement for analog video. For example, a VHS VCR might be described as having 250 lines of resolution as measured across a circle circumscribed in the center of the screen (approximately 440 pixels edge-to-edge). With analog signals, the number of vertical lines and the frame rate are directly proportional to the bandwidth of the signal transmitted.

A typical resolution of 720×480 or 720x576 means that the television display has 720 pixels across and 480 or 576 pixels on the vertical axis. The higher the resolution on a specified display the sharper the image. Contrast ratio is a measurement of the range between the lightest and darkest points on the screen.

The higher the contrast ratio, the better-looking picture there is in terms of richness, deepness, and shadow detail. The brightness of a picture measures how vibrant and impacting the colors are. This is measured in candela per square metre (cd/m^{2}).

On the other hand, the so-called brightness and contrast adjustment controls on televisions and monitors are traditionally used to control different aspects of the picture display. The brightness control shifts the black level, affecting the image intensity or brightness, while the contrast control adjusts the contrast range of the image.

== Transmission band ==
There are various bands on which televisions operate depending upon the country. The VHF and UHF signals in bands III to V are generally used. Lower frequencies do not have enough bandwidth available for television.

Countries with 60 Hz power line frequency use frame rates very near 30 per second, while 50 Hz regions use 25 frames per second. These rates were chosen to minimize the distortion of pictures that could be produced in analog receivers. For a given frame rate, an analog signal with 400 lines per frame would use less bandwidth than one with 600 or 800 lines per frame. Higher bandwidth makes receiver design more complicated, requires higher radio frequencies to be used, and may limit the number of channels that can be allocated in a given area; the same radio frequencies useful for television are also in high demand for other services such as aviation, land mobile radio, and mobile telephones.

Although the BBC initially used Band I VHF at 45 MHz, this frequency is (in the UK) no longer in use for this purpose. Band II is used for FM radio transmissions. Higher frequencies behave more like light and do not penetrate buildings or travel around obstructions well enough to be used in a conventional broadcast TV system, so they are generally only used for MMDS and satellite television, which uses frequencies from 2 to 12 GHz. TV systems in most countries relay the video as an AM (amplitude-modulation) signal and the sound as an FM (frequency-modulation) signal. An exception is France, where the sound is AM.

== Aspect ratios ==
Aspect ratio refers to the ratio of the horizontal to vertical measurements of a television's picture. Mechanically scanned television as first demonstrated by John Logie Baird in 1926 used a 7:3 vertical aspect ratio, oriented for the head and shoulders of a single person in close-up.

Most of the early electronic TV systems, from the mid-1930s onward, shared the same aspect ratio of 4:3 which was chosen to match the Academy Ratio used in cinema films at the time. This ratio was also square enough to be conveniently viewed on round cathode ray tubes (CRTs), which were all that could be produced given the manufacturing technology of the time. (Today's CRT technology allows the manufacture of much wider tubes, and the flat-screen technologies which are becoming steadily more popular have no technical aspect ratio limitations at all.) The BBC's television service used a more squarish 5:4 ratio from 1936 to 3 April 1950, when it too switched to a 4:3 ratio. This did not present significant problems, as most sets at the time used round tubes which were easily adjusted to the 4:3 ratio when the transmissions changed.

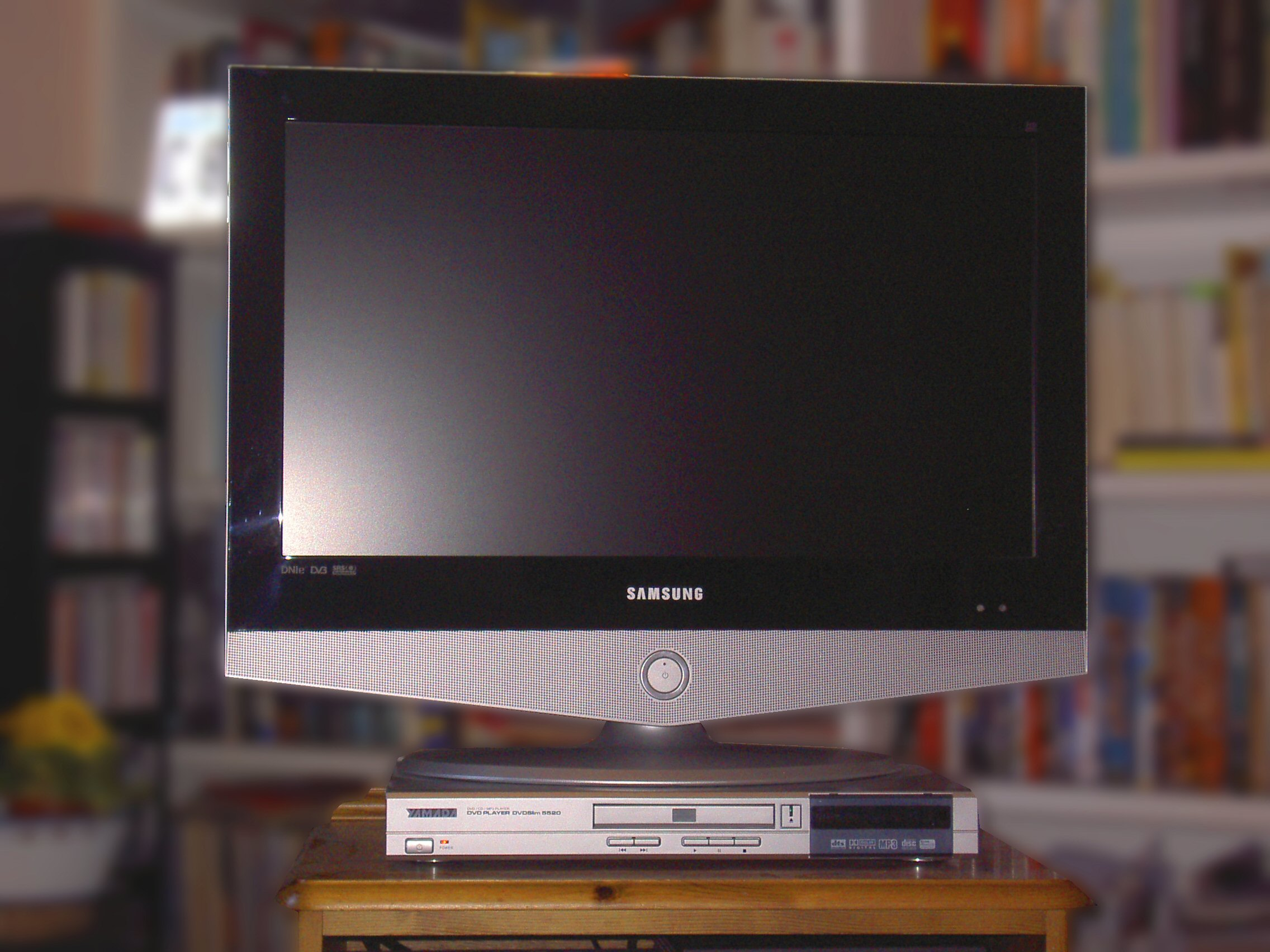
A Samsung LE26R41BD HDTV

In the early 1950s, movie studios moved towards widescreen aspect ratios such as CinemaScope in an effort to distance their product from television. Although this was initially just a gimmick, widescreen is still the format of choice today and 4:3 aspect ratio movies are rare.

Yet the various television systems were not originally designed to be compatible with film at all. Traditional, narrow-screen movies are projected onto a television camera either so that the top of the screens line up to show facial features, or, for films with subtitles, the bottoms. What this means is that filmed newspapers or long captions filling the screen for explanation are cut off at each end. Similarly, while the frame rate of sound films is 24 per second, the screen scanning rate of the NTSC is 29.97 Hz (per second), which requires a complex scanning schedule. That of PAL and SECAM are 50 Hz, which means that films are shortened (and the sound is offkey) by scanning each frame twice for 25 per second.

The switch to digital television systems was used as an opportunity to change the standard television picture format from the old ratio of 4:3 (1.33:1) to an aspect ratio of 16:9 (approximately 1.78:1). This enables TV to get closer to the aspect ratio of modern widescreen movies, which range from 1.66:1 through 1.85:1 to 2.35:1. There are two methods for transporting widescreen content, the most common of which uses what is called anamorphic widescreen format. This format is very similar to the technique used to fit a widescreen movie frame inside a 1.33:1 35 mm film frame. The image is compressed horizontally when recorded, then expanded again when played back. The anamorphic widescreen 16:9 format was first introduced via European PALplus television broadcasts and then later on "widescreen" Laser Discs and DVDs; the ATSC HDTV system uses straight widescreen format, no horizontal compression or expansion is used.

Recently "widescreen" has spread from television to computing where both desktop and laptop computers are commonly equipped with widescreen displays. There are some complaints about distortions of movie picture ratio due to some DVD playback software not taking account of aspect ratios; but this may subside as the DVD playback software matures. Furthermore, computer and laptop widescreen displays are in the 16:10 aspect ratio both physically in size and in pixel counts, and not in 16:9 of consumer televisions, leading to further complexity. This was a result of widescreen computer display engineers' assumption that people viewing 16:9 content on their computer would prefer that an area of the screen be reserved for playback controls, subtitles or their Taskbar, as opposed to viewing content full-screen.

=== Aspect ratio incompatibility ===
The television industry's changing of aspect ratios is not without difficulties, and can present a considerable problem.

Displaying a widescreen aspect (rectangular) image on a conventional aspect (square or 4:3) display can be shown:

- in "letterboxed" format, with black horizontal bars at the top and bottom
- with part of the image being cropped, usually the extreme left and right of the image being cut off (or in "pan and scan", parts selected by an operator or a viewer)
- with the image horizontally compressed

A conventional aspect (square or 4:3) image on a widescreen aspect (rectangular with longer horizon) display can be shown:

- in "pillar box" format, with black vertical bars to the left and right
- with upper and lower portions of the image cut off (or in "tilt and scan", parts selected by an operator)
- with the image vertically compressed

A common compromise is to shoot or create material at an aspect ratio of 14:9, and to lose some image at each side for 4:3 presentation, and some image at top and bottom for 16:9 presentation. In recent years, the cinematographic process known as Super 35 (championed by James Cameron) has been used to film a number of major movies such as Titanic, Legally Blonde, Austin Powers, and Crouching Tiger, Hidden Dragon. This process results in a camera-negative which can then be used to create both wide-screen theatrical prints, and standard "full screen" releases for television/VHS/DVD which avoid the need for either "letterboxing" or the severe loss of information caused by conventional pan-and-scan cropping.

== The end of analog television broadcasting ==
=== NTSC ===
In North America, the basic signal standards since 1941 had been compatible enough in 2007 that even the oldest monochrome televisions could still receive color broadcasts. However, the United States Congress passed a law that required the cessation of all conventional television broadcast signals by February 2009. After that date, all NTSC standard televisions with analog-only tuners went dark unless fitted with a digital ATSC tuner. The digital channels occupy the same spectrum as the analog channels. Some of the spectrum previously occupied by the highest numbered channels was auctioned off by the United States' Federal Communications Commission for other uses.

=== PAL and SECAM ===
PAL and SECAM are expected not to be broadcast in Europe and Eurasia by the mid-2020s. PAL-M may have a similar decommissioning timeline.

The EU recommended that Member Countries switch from Analog to digital by January 1, 2012. Luxembourg and the Netherlands already completed their closedowns in 2006, and Finland and Sweden closed down their analog broadcasts in 2007.

Britain started its digital switch in October 2007. At 2 am on Wednesday 17 October 2007, the BBC2 transmitter covering the Whitehaven and Copeland areas (NW England) was disabled. The remaining four analog channels ceased broadcasting shortly after. The original five channels are now available only in digital form, alongside other additional free-to-air channels

== New developments ==
- 3D television
- Ambilight
- Broadcast flag
- CableCARD
- Digital Light Processing (DLP)
- Digital rights management (DRM)
- Digital television (DTV)
- Digital Video Recorders (DVR)
- Direct Broadcast Satellite TV (DBS)
- DVD and HD DVD standards
- Blu-ray Disc
- Flat panel display
- Flicker-free (100 Hz or 120 Hz, depending on country)
- High-definition television (HDTV)
- High-Definition Multimedia Interface (HDMI)
- IPTV also known as Internet television (IPTV)
- Laser TV display technology
- Liquid crystal display television (LCD)
- Mirror TV
- OLED TV - Roll up TV (using organic light-emitting diodes)
- P2PTV
- Pay-per-view
- Personal video recorders (PVR)
- Picture-in-picture (PiP)
- Pixelplus
- Placeshifting
- Plasma display
- Remote controls
- Surface-conduction electron-emitter display (SED) display technology
- The Slingbox
- Time shifting
- Video on-demand (VOD)
- Ultra High Definition Television (UHDTV)
- Web TV

A long screen television in Korea.

== Exterior designs ==
In the early days of television, cabinets were made of wood grain (often simulated particularly in the later years), however, they went out of style in the 1980s. Up until the late 1970s, console TV/Hi Fi's were common. These were large (about 6' wide by 4' high) wooden cabinets containing a television, speakers, radio and a turntable.

== See also ==
- Broadcast safe
- Electronic waste
- History of display technology
- History of television
