= Ferroelectric liquid crystal display =

Type of display technology

Ferroelectric liquid-crystal display (FLCD) is a display technology based on the ferroelectric properties of chiral smectic liquid crystals as proposed in 1980 by Clark and Lagerwall. Reportedly discovered in 1975, several companies pursued the development of FLCD technologies, notably Canon and Central Research Laboratories (CRL), along with others including Seiko, Sharp, Mitsubishi and GEC. Canon and CRL pursued different technological approaches with regard to the switching of display cells, these providing the individual pixels or subpixels, and the production of intermediate pixel intensities between full transparency and full opacity, these differing approaches being adopted by other companies seeking to develop FLCD products.

== Development ==
By 1985, Seiko had already demonstrated a colour FLCD panel able to display a 10-inch diagonal still image with a resolution of 640 x 400. By 1993, Canon had delivered the first commercial application of the technology in its EZPS Japanese-language desktop publishing system in the form of a 15-inch monochrome display with a reported cost of around £2,000, and the company demonstrated a 21-inch 64-colour display and a 24-inch 16-greyscale display, both with a 1280 x 1024 resolution and able to show "GUI software with multiple windows". Other applications included projectors, viewfinders and printers.

The FLCD did not make many inroads as a direct view display device. Manufacturing of larger FLCDs was problematic making them unable to compete against direct view LCDs based on nematic liquid crystals using the Twisted nematic field effect or In-Plane Switching. Today, the FLCD is used in reflective microdisplays based on Liquid Crystal on Silicon technology. Using ferroelectric liquid crystal (FLC) in FLCoS technology allows a much smaller display area which eliminates the problems of manufacturing larger area FLC displays. Additionally, the dot pitch or pixel pitch of such displays can be as low as 6 μm giving a very high resolution display in a small area. To produce color and grey-scale, time multiplexing is used, exploiting the sub-millisecond switching time of the ferroelectric liquid crystal.

== Application ==
The microdisplays find applications in 3D head mounted displays (HMDs), image insertion in surgical microscopes, and electronic viewfinders where direct-view LCDs fail to provide more than 600 ppi resolution. Ferroelectric LCoS also finds commercial uses in Structured illumination for 3D-Metrology and Super-resolution microscopy. Some commercial products use FLCD. High switching speed allows building optical switches and shutters in printer heads.

== See also ==
- Multi-primary color display
- Segmented liquid-crystal display
