= Low-key lighting =

Stage lighting style

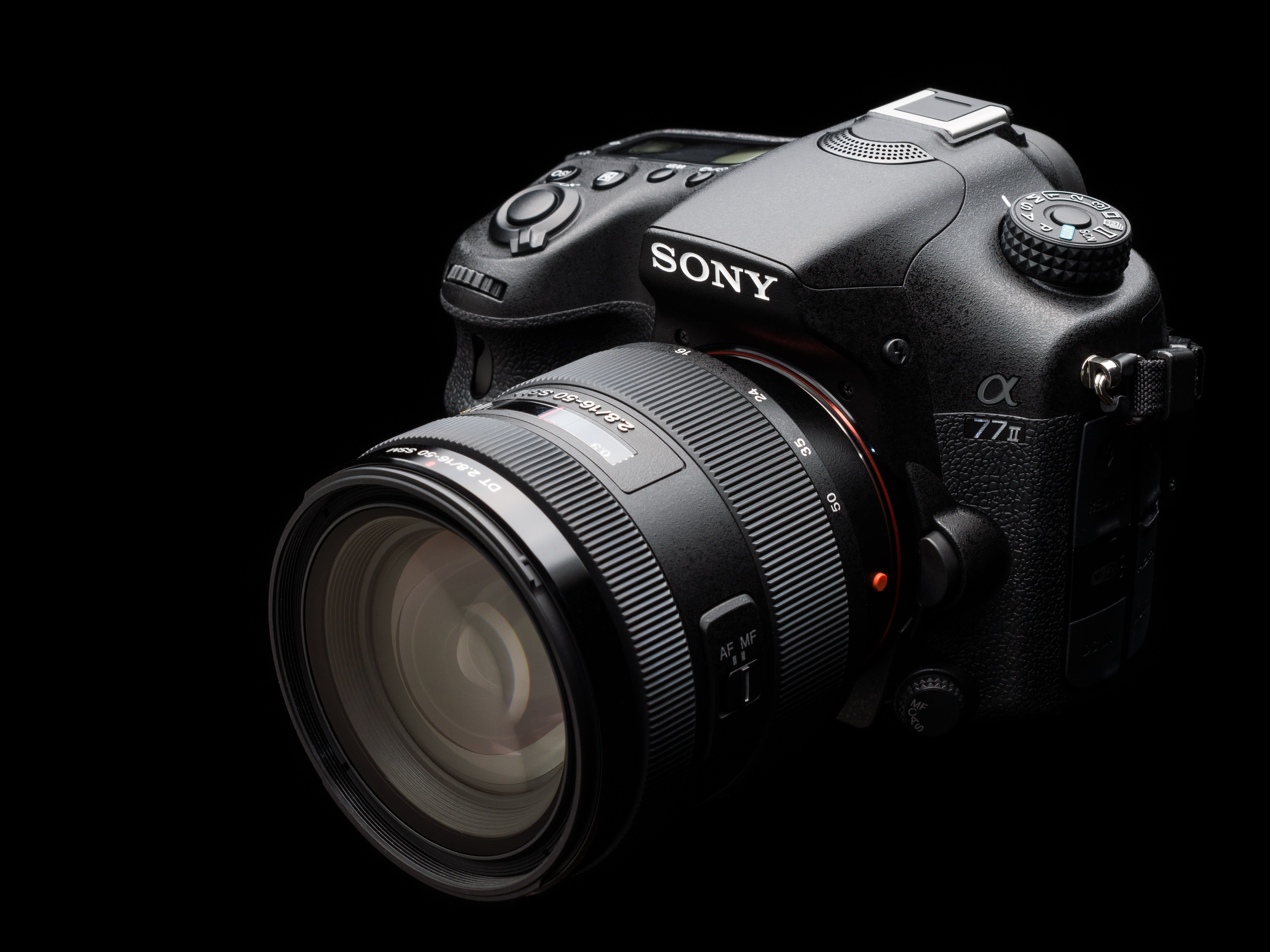
Low-key lighting is often used in product advertising. This camera is lit by a soft box positioned above, with a white reflector to the front-left

Low-key lighting is a style of lighting for photography, film or television. It is a necessary element in creating a chiaroscuro effect. Traditional photographic lighting (three-point lighting) uses a key light, a fill light and a back light for illumination. Low-key lighting often uses only a key light, optionally controlled with a fill light or a simple reflector.

Low key light accentuates the contours of the subject by throwing areas into shade while a fill light or reflector may illuminate the shadow areas to control contrast. The relative strength of key-to-fill, known as the lighting ratio, can be measured using a light meter. Low key lighting has a higher lighting ratio, e.g., 8:1, than high-key lighting, which can approach 1:1.

== Examples in film ==
The term "low key" is also used in cinematography and photography to refer to any scene with a high lighting ratio, especially if there is a predominance of shadowy areas. It tends to heighten the sense of alienation felt by the viewer, hence is typically used in dramas, film noir, and horror films.

Some classic noir films that have used the technique include The Big Sleep, Double Indemnity, and others. In The Big Sleep, lamps are frequently used as light sources and often only illuminate certain details in a scene, creating sharp silhouettes and providing a stark lighting contrast for much of the film. Specific examples of the technique's use regarding the lamps occur whenever Philip Marlowe (played by Humphrey Bogart) has to place a phone call to the police. He turns on a lamp every time he does so, indicating his return to the side of the "good guys".

In Double Indemnity, the lighting in Walter Neff's (played by Fred MacMurray) confession scenes underscores the murder which he is confessing to, and suggests a “dark” aspect to his character. In addition, low key lighting appears in the film in numerous other instances, such as the scenes taking place in Phyllis's (played by Barbara Stanwyck) house, more specifically when either Neff or Phyllis is alone or together within the home.

The chiaroscuro effect the technique often created was also used liberally in classic noir. An example of such a filmmaking choice can be seen in the 1940 film noir Stranger on the Third Floor, which used the lighting contrast to highlight the fantastical qualities of the environment. Chiaroscuro and by extension low key lighting was also used to great effect in German expressionist cinema, widely considered a forerunner of film noir.

Modern neo-noir films such as There Will Be Blood have also employed the tactic to great effect, often using the technique to evoke a sense of unease. Other modern noir-adjacent films and television shows that have used the technique include Joker, The Batman and the films of David Fincher, director of Seven. Fincher in particular makes extensive use of limited light sources, often highlighting an invisible conflict between “light [and] darkness” by effectively controlling the light of his scenes.

Cinematographers such as Roger Deakins also use aspects of low key lighting in their scene composition. In particular, Deakins and others used natural light as much as they could, which often created low key lighting when filmed in low light conditions. Examples of films Deakins has worked on include Blade Runner 2049 and The Man Who Wasn't There. More recent examples include the films of David Lowery and Andrew Droz Palermo, the latter of whom praises natural low-key lighting techniques for their “painterly and expressionistic” quality. Cinematographer Devan Scott also notes the influence of digital technology in creating these films as well as its increased use in the industry by citing the technology's relative ease of use, and stating that the increase in dark lighting is “a trend enabled by tools” first and foremost.

The proliferation of such techniques has been criticized by viewers in several instances. For example, many viewers reacted poorly to a dimly-lit final battle in the finale of Game of Thrones, despite series cinematographer Fabian Wagner stating that the darkness was intentional, claiming the “show runners decided that [the battle] had to be a dark episode.” Other modern examples of viewer backlash include films such as Arrival and Solo, as well as TV shows such as Ozark and The Mandalorian.

Low-key images

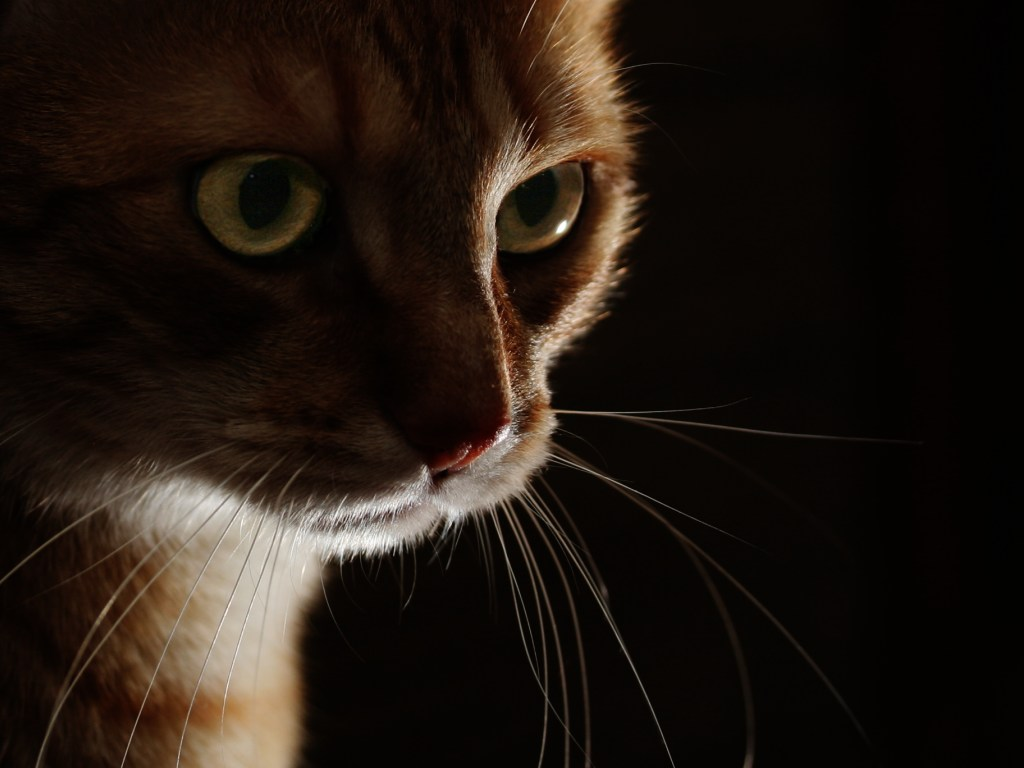

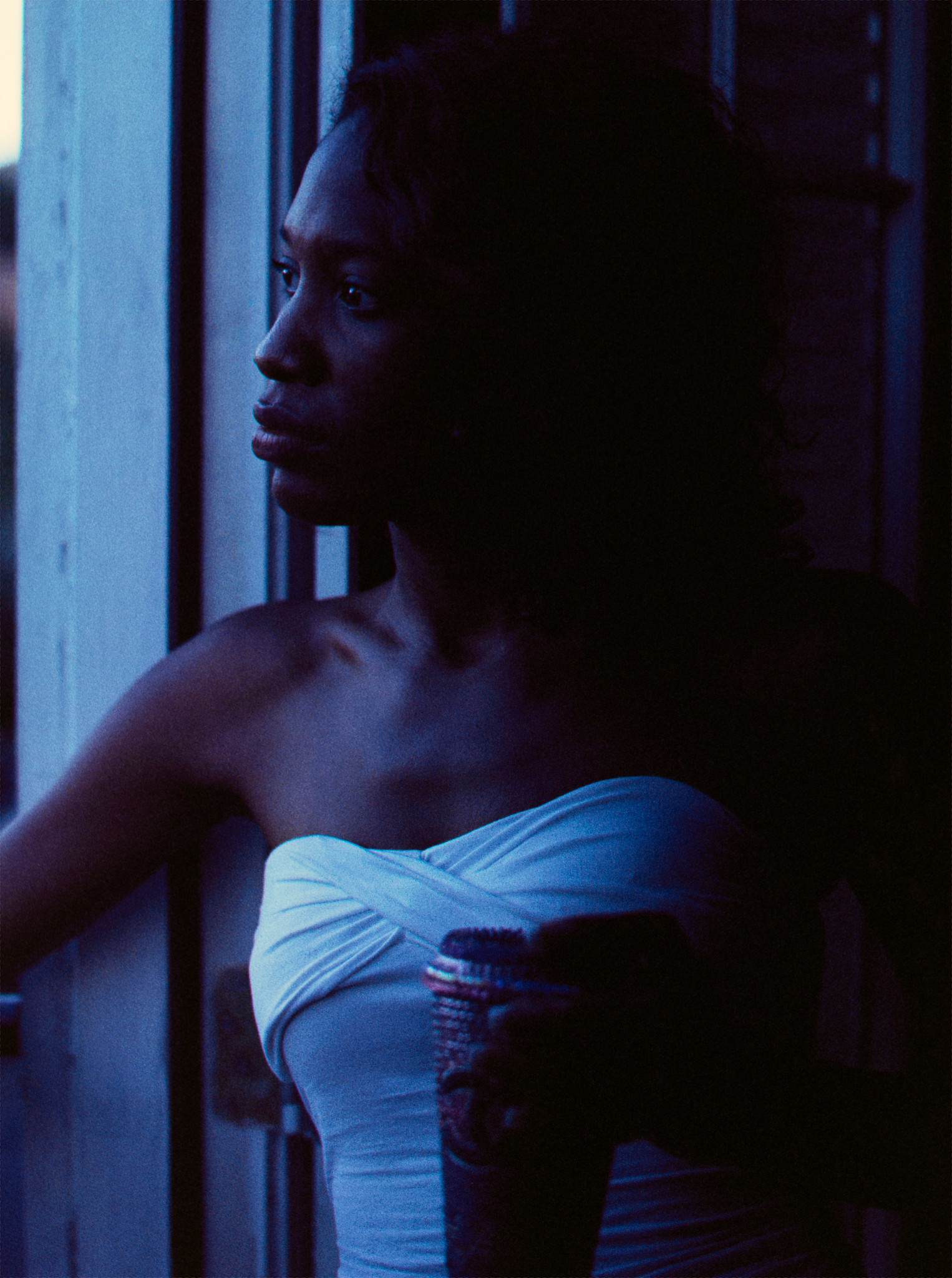

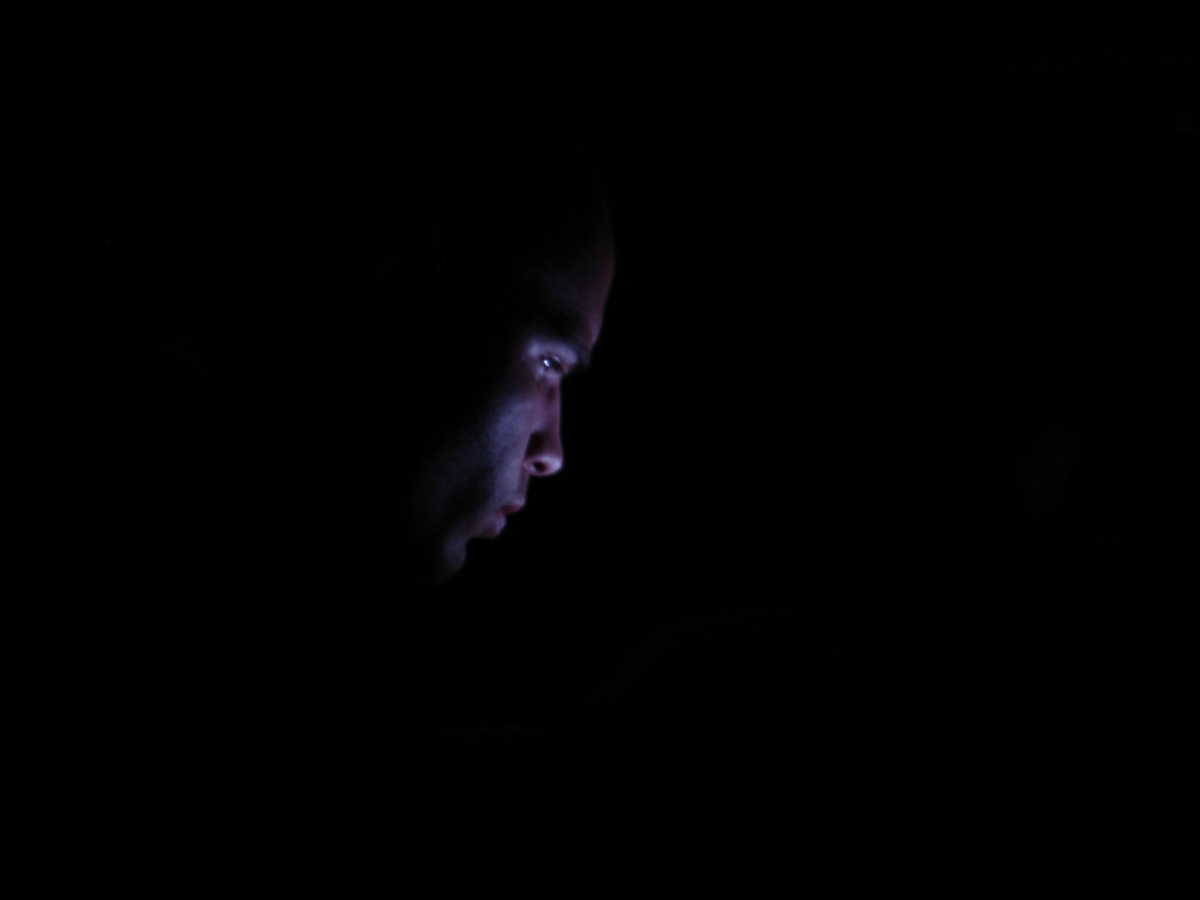

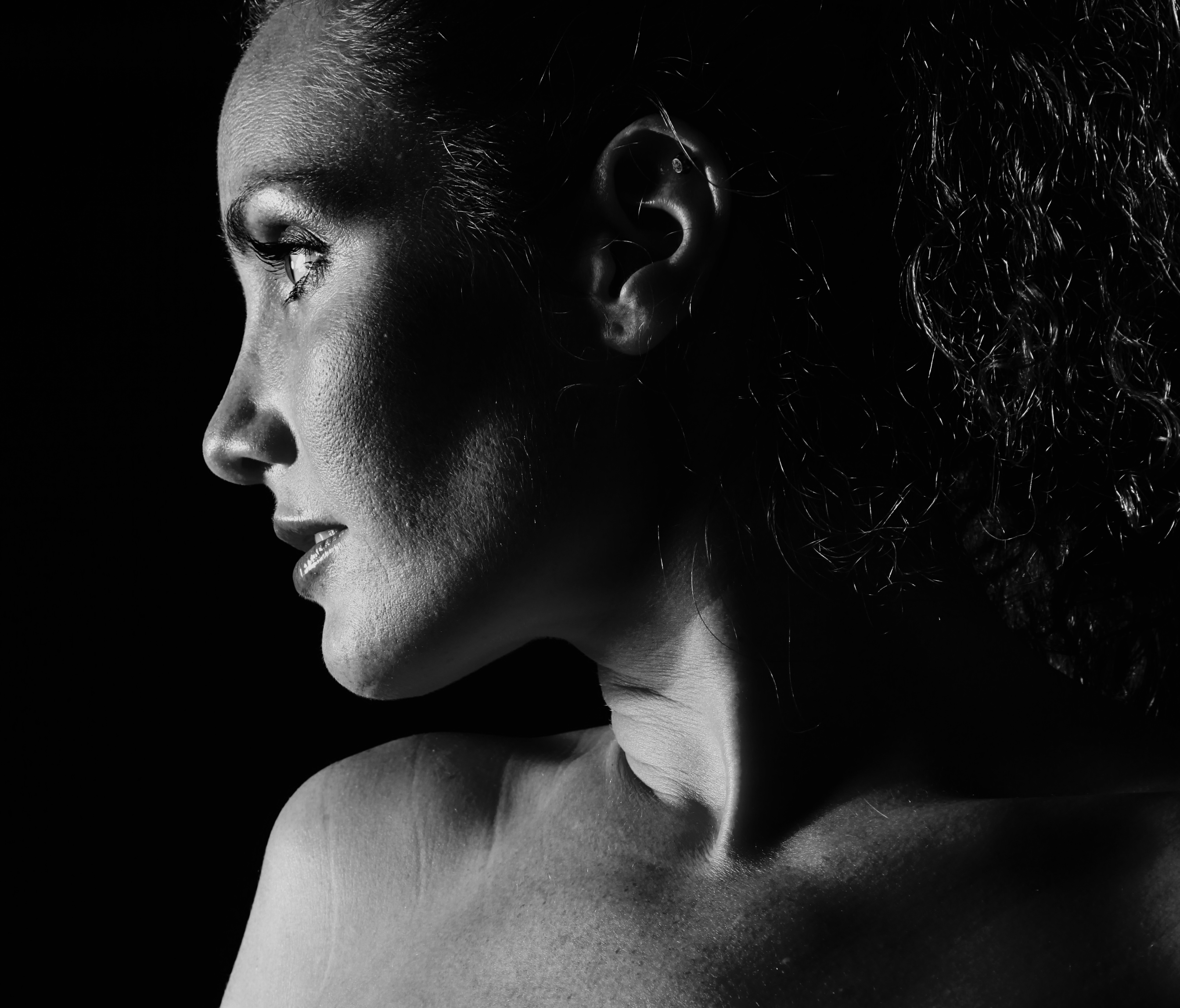

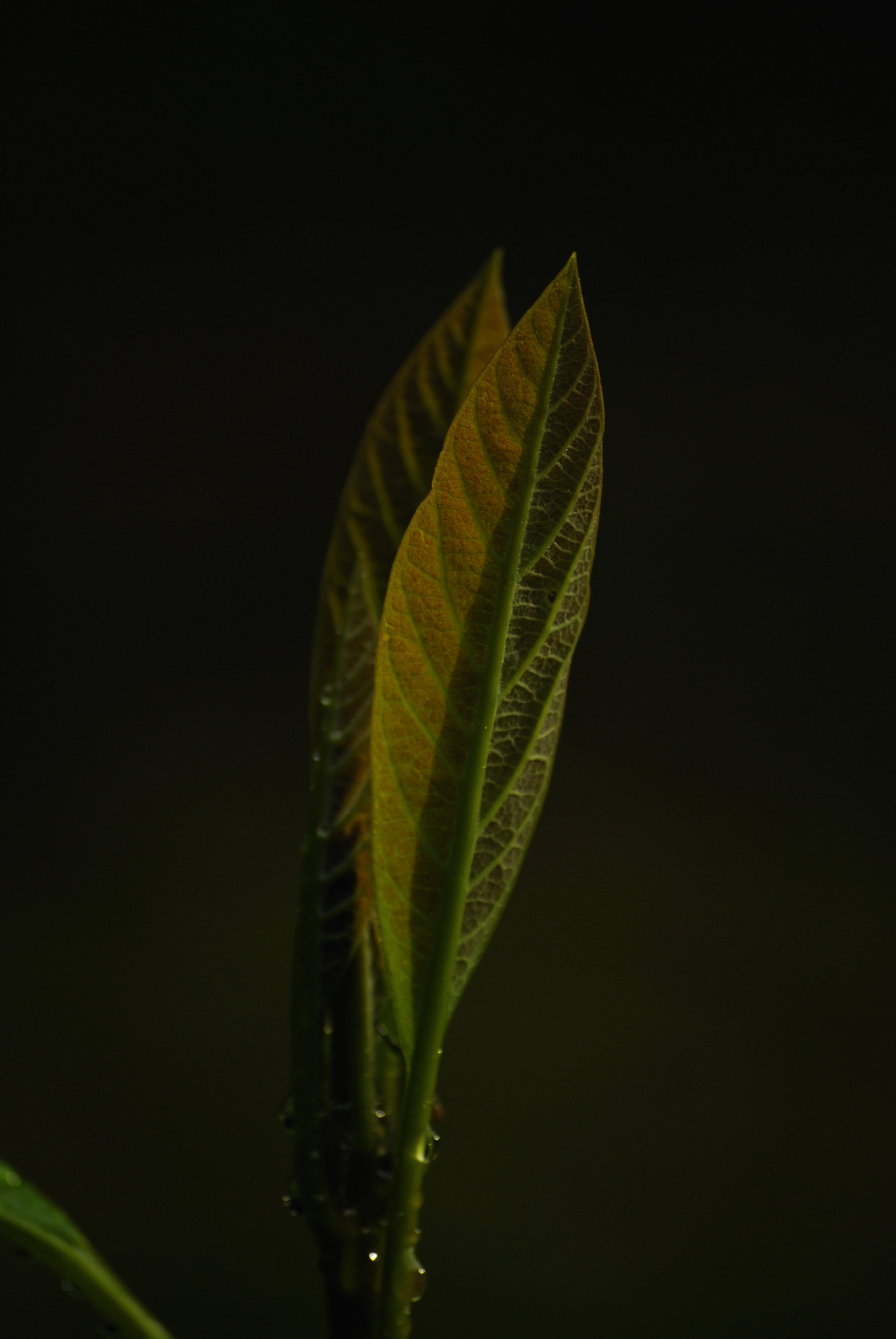

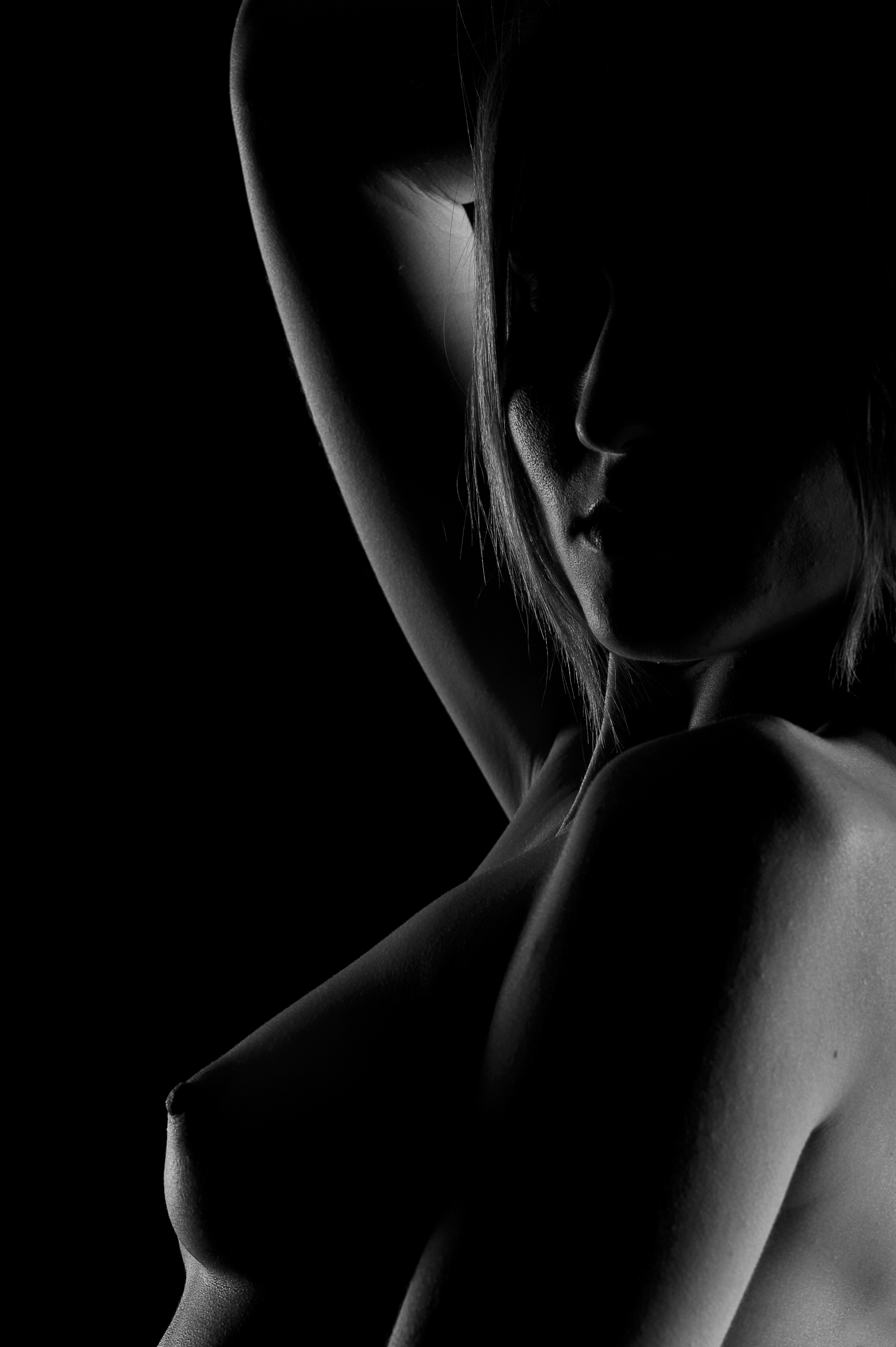

== See also ==
- Backlighting (lighting design)
- Chiaroscuro
- Contre-jour
- High-key lighting
- Low-key photography
