= SmartLink =

SmartLink may refer to:

- SmartLink (smart card), an electronic fare collection system used by the Port Authority of New York and New Jersey
- SmartLink (television), a wireless communications protocol
- SmartLink (lighting), a wireless communication protocol for lighting products.
- smart tags, a feature of MS Office and Internet Explorer
- Smartlink, another name for AV.link, a television-related protocol
- SmartLINK, an app used to track migrants by U.S. Immigration and Customs Enforcement
- Smart links, a type of landing page common
- SMARTLINKS, a brand of interlocking toys owned by Wendy's Corp.

== See also ==
- Smart linking
