= James Dwyer McGee =

Australian physicist and inventor

James Dwyer McGee (17 December 1903 – 28 February 1987) was an Australian scientist and photoelectronics inventor, who worked for many years at EMI in west London, largely developing the first television camera.

== Early life ==
He was born in Queanbeyan, New South Wales in Australia, the sixth of seven children. His father was Francis Joseph McGee (8 July 1866 – 13 February 1950). He attended St Patrick's College, Goulburn.

He studied Physics and Mathematics at university. In 1928 he won a 1851 Research Fellowship to study in the UK, and he gained a PhD in Nuclear Physics from Clare College, Cambridge in November 1931.

== Career ==
=== EMI ===
He moved to EMI in January 1932. J.D. McGee worked with the first technology of television, and invented the BBC's first television cameras with William Francis Tedham (1902–2000) at EMI's Central Research Laboratories in Middlesex. Tedham and McGee submitted their first patent on 12 May 1932.

He worked at EMI with Hans Gerhard Lubszyński (31 August 1904-1997) and Sydney Rodda.

He featured in a BBC1 documentary programme at 9.30 pm on Thursday 3 November 1966 entitled The Discovery of Television.

=== University ===
He was invited to the Department of Physics at Imperial College London in 1954 by Patrick Blackett, where he became Professor of Applied Physics. He researched image intensifiers, photomultipliers, and secondary emission. In his academic staff was Leonard Mandel (until 1964). He retired in 1971.

He left the university in 1980 and moved to Australia.

=== Lectures ===
He gave a lecture at the Royal Society of Arts in February 1952, about the future of television, entitled Television Technique as an Aid to Observation.

He gave the RTS Fleming Lecture on 31 October 1964 and 19 January 1956.

On 14 February 1957 he gave a lecture to the British Kinematograph, Sound and Television Society (BKS) entitled Photo-electronic aids to Photography.

== Personal life ==
He was given the OBE in the 1952 New Year Honours, and the FRS on 17 March 1966.

He lived in west London at 56 Corringway, south of Hanger Lane tube station, east of the North Circular Road. In 1939, he was living slightly further south on Creffield Road, at the junction with Inglis Road. In the mid-1930s, he lived at 9 Kingfield Road, the other side of the North Circular Road.

== See also ==
- Gerhard W. Goetze
- George Robert Carruthers
- Timeline of electrical and electronic engineering
