= Sharp SH005 =

2010 mobile phone model

SH005
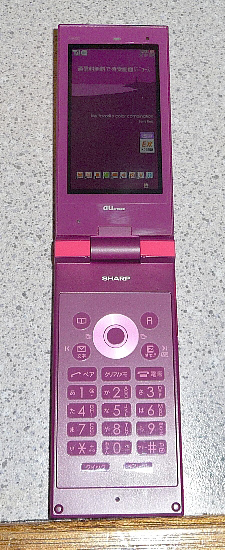
- SH005 in Berry Red
- Brand: au
- Manufacturer: Sharp
- First released: January 28, 2010
- Discontinued: September 2010
- Successor: SH009
- Compatible networks: CDMA 1X WIN (CDMA2000 1xMC) (800 MHz / New 800 MHz / 2 GHz); CDMA 1X WIN (CDMA2000 1xEV-DO Rev.A)
- Form factor: Clamshell
- Colors: Morning White; Sakura Pink; Berry Red; Honey Yellow; Field Green; Choco-Mint Blue; Night Black
- Dimensions: 108 mm (4.3 in) H 49 mm (1.9 in) W 14.2 mm (0.56 in) D
- Weight: 124 g (4.4 oz)
- Operating system: KCP+
- CPU: Qualcomm MSM7500 (600 MHz)
- Storage: 760 MB (Internal data folder)
- Removable storage: microSD (up to 2 GB) microSDHC (up to 16 GB)
- Rear camera: 5.27 MP CMOS with Face Detection AF and Image Stabilization
- Front camera: None
- Display: 3.0 in (76 mm) New Mobile ASV LCD, Wide VGA+ (480×854 pixels), 260,000 colors
- Water resistance: IPX5 / IPX7
- Model: SH005
- Made in: China

The SH005 is a CDMA 1X WIN feature phone manufactured by Sharp for KDDI and Okinawa Cellular Telephone under the brand au. It was released on January 28, 2010.

The SH005 was the first mobile phone offered by au to be launched in seven color variations simultaneously. It was targeted primarily at male and female users in their 20s.

== Overview ==
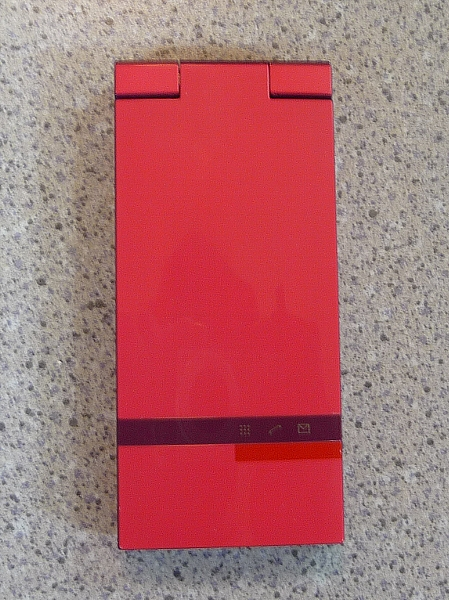
Back panel (Berry Red)

Its promotional slogan was "7-color choice, waterproof, slim", featuring IPX5/IPX7 equivalent water resistance. Although not heavily marketed for high-end features, the device is equipped with a Full Wide VGA LCD display, a 5.27-megapixel CMOS camera, an accelerometer, an FM radio/transmitter, and Bluetooth wireless communication. It lacks a secondary external display screen, relying instead on external LED illumination icons to notify users of incoming calls and messages.

The device does not feature a dedicated cradle/desktop charger option or external charging terminals; charging must be performed via the external connection port. Users are advised to handle the connector cap carefully during charging to maintain its waterproof seal.

== Software update and issues ==
On June 15, 2010, KDDI announced software update distribution for Sharp's CDMA 1X WIN SH005 to fix a glitch where the devices rarely failed to power on. If a phone became unbootable due to this bug, it required physical repair service at an au Shop.

The update also resolved an issue exclusive to the SH005, where apps utilizing the built-in accelerometer incorrectly recognized left and right directional motions. Additionally, this software update enabled support for KDDI's "au Femtocell" home mini-base stations, making the SH005 the first older models to receive femtocell compatibility prior to the service's official launch on July 1, 2010.

== History ==
- October 19, 2009 – Officially announced by KDDI and Sharp.
- January 28, 2010 – Released in the Okinawa region.
- January 29, 2010 – Released in Hokkaido, Tohoku, Hokuriku, Kanto, Chubu, Kansai, Chugoku, and Shikoku regions.
- January 30, 2010 – Released in the Kyushu region.
- September 2010 – Sales ended.

== Features and services ==
- Waterproofing (IPX5/IPX7)
- AQUOS Blu-ray Disc recorder connectivity
- FM transmitter
- Blog upload tool
- Emoji creator
- Business card reader, barcode reader, and text reader

Supported Services
| LISMO (Chakuta-full) (Chakuta-full Plus) (LISMO Video Clip) (LISMO Video) (LISMO Book) | EZ Keitai Arrange | Barcode Reader & Maker | PC Site Viewer |
| au BOX | Wireless Music | au Smart Sports; Run & Walk; Karada Manager; Golf / Fitness; Calorie Counter | EZ Navi Walk |
| EZ Passenger Seat Navi | Anshin Navi | Disaster Navi | Naka-chen |
| EZ Appli FullGame! Bluetooth Match | EZ Appli (BREW) | ~~Open Appli Player~~ | ~~PC Document Viewer~~ |
| Arrange Menu | ~~au one gadget~~ Multi-Play Window; Quick Access Menu | Jibun Bank App | EZ FM |
| EZ Channel; EZ Channel Plus; EZ News Flash; EZ News EX | Bluetooth | Touch Message | EZ FeliCa |
| Mobile PC Email | Deco-mail | Decoration Animation | au one Mail |
| Emergency Location Report | 1seg | Global Passport (CDMA) | Infrared communication (IrSimple) |
