= Background light =

Lighting used to illuminate the background area of a set in theatre and film

A typical four-point lighting setup

A background light is used to illuminate the background area of a set. The background light will also provide separation between the subject and the background. Many lighting setups follow a three-point lighting or four-point lighting setup. Four-point lighting is the same as three-point lighting with the addition of a background light. In a four-point lighting, the background light is placed last and is usually placed directly behind the subject and pointed at the background. By adding a background light to a set, filmmakers can add a sense of depth to shots.

In film, the background light is usually of lower intensity. More than one light could be used to light uniformly a background or alternatively to highlight points of interest.

In video and television, the background light is usually of similar intensity to the key light because video cameras are less capable of handling high-contrast ratios. In order to provide much needed separation between subject and background, the background light will have a color filter, blue for example, which will make the foreground pop up.

== See also ==
- Bias lighting, a weak light used on the wall behind a monitor
- Backlighting, the illumination of elements in the foreground
