= Three-point lighting =

Lighting technique

A typical three-point lighting setup

Three-point lighting is a standard method used in visual media such as theatre, video, film, still photography, computer-generated imagery and 3D computer graphics. By using three separate positions, the photographer can illuminate the shot's subject (such as a person) however desired, while also controlling (or eliminating) the shadows produced by direct lighting.

== Setup ==
=== Key Light ===
The key light, as the name suggests, shines directly upon the subject and serves as its principal illuminator; more than anything else, the strength, color and angle of the key determines the shot's overall lighting design. It is usually placed between 30 and 45 degrees to one side of the camera–subject axis and elevated 30 to 45 degrees above it, imitating a natural source such as the sun or an interior lamp.

In indoor shots, the key is commonly a specialized lamp, or a camera's flash. In outdoor daytime shots, the Sun often serves as the key light. In this case, of course, the photographer cannot set the light in the exact position they want, so instead arranges the shot to best capture the sunlight, perhaps after waiting for the sun to position itself just right.

=== Fill Light ===
An animated demonstration of three-point lighting

The fill light also shines on the subject, but from a side angle relative to the key, usually from the opposite side of the camera at 30 to 45 degrees to the camera–subject axis, and is often placed at a lower position than the key, at about the height of the camera. It balances the key by illuminating shaded surfaces, and lessening or eliminating chiaroscuro effects, such as the shadow cast by a person's nose upon the rest of the face. It is usually a softer, more diffuse and less bright light than the key; its brightness is often up to half that of the key. A fill light that is too intense gives a flat, low-contrast image. Not using a fill at all can result in stark contrasts (due to shadows) across the subject's surface, depending upon the key light's harshness. Sometimes, as in low-key lighting, this is a deliberate effect, but shots intended to look more natural and less stylistic require a fill.

In some situations a photographer can use a reflector (such as a piece of white cardstock mounted off-camera, or even a white-painted wall) as a fill light instead of an actual lamp. Reflecting and redirecting the key light's rays back upon the subject from a different angle can cause a softer, subtler effect than using another lamp.

=== Backlight ===
The back, hair, or shoulder light shines on the subject from behind and usually from above, typically, though not necessarily, to one side. Backlight is different from a kick or kicker in that it contributes to a portion of the shading on the visible surface of the subject.

Backlighting provides the subject a rim of light, which separates the subject from the background and highlights contours, especially along the upper part of the subject. This creates a thin outline around the subject without necessarily hitting its front visible surface.

== Four point lighting ==
A typical four-point lighting setup

The addition of a fourth light, the background light, makes for a four-point lighting setup.

The background light is placed behind the subject(s), on a high grid, or low to the ground. Unlike the other three lights, which illuminate foreground elements like actors and props, it illuminates background elements, such as walls or outdoor scenery. This technique can be used to eliminate shadows cast by foreground elements onto the background, or to draw more attention to the background. It also helps to offset the single eye nature of the camera by giving depth to the composition.

== Gallery ==
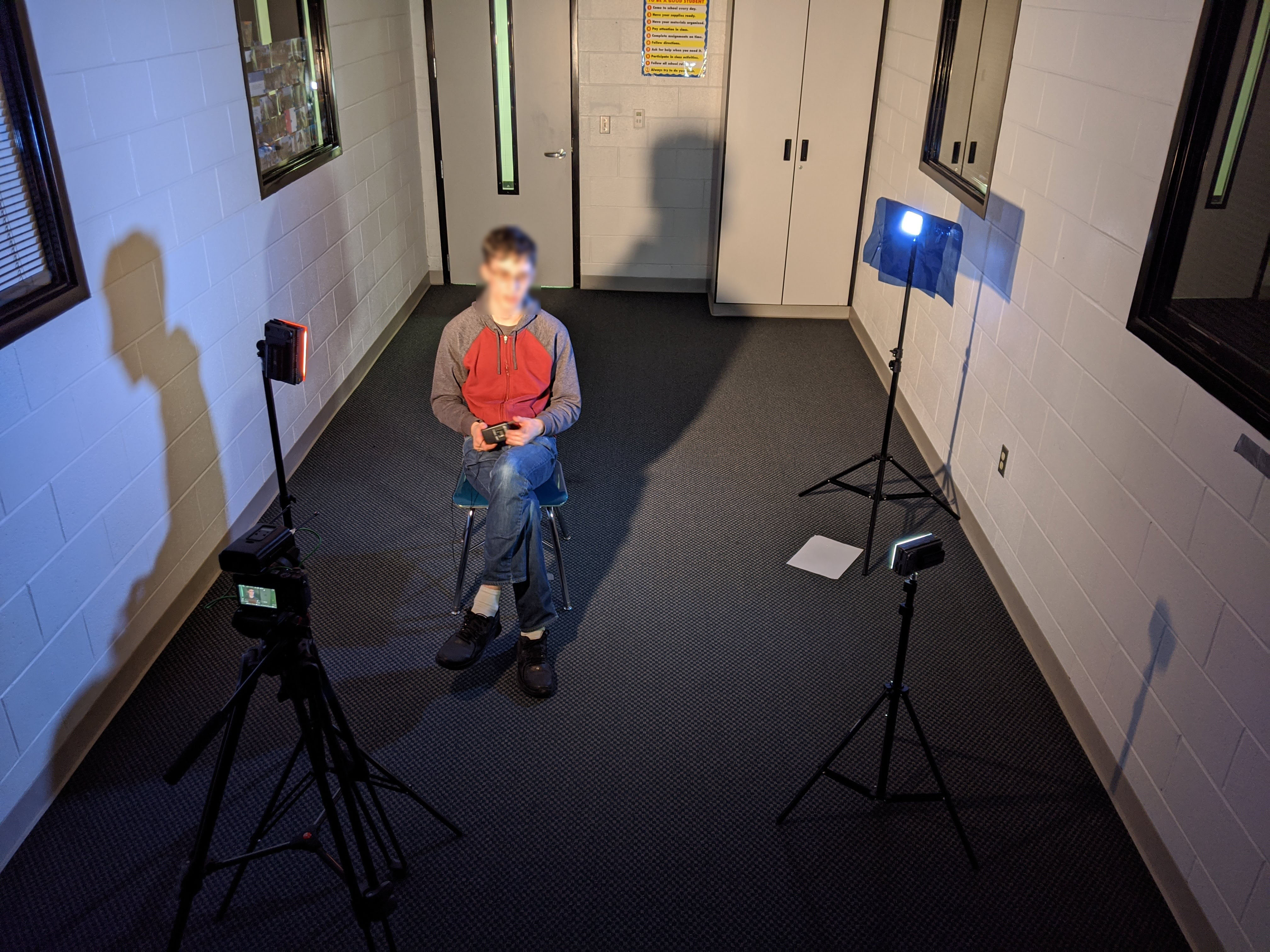
Three-point lighting from front

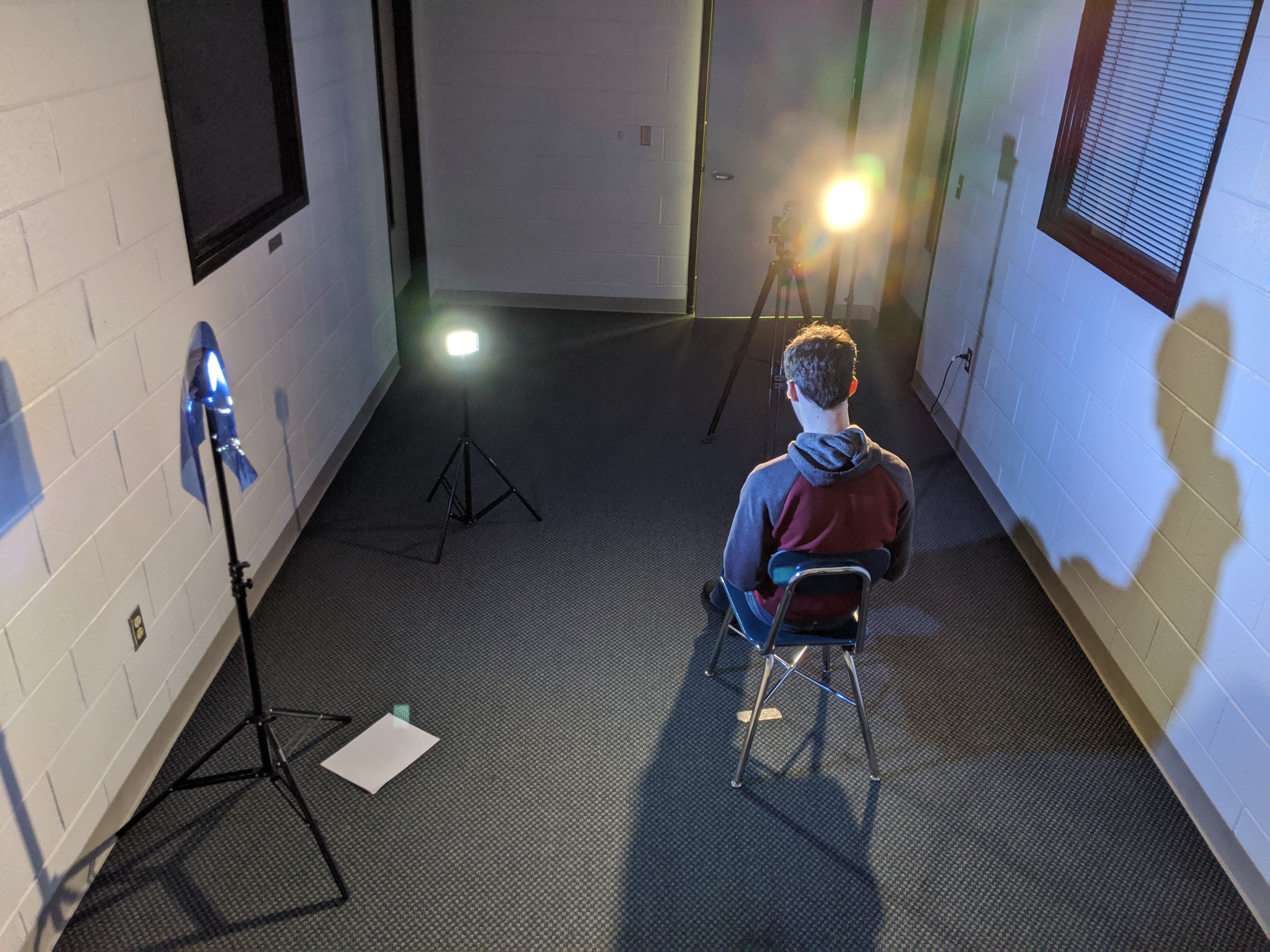
Three-point lighting from back

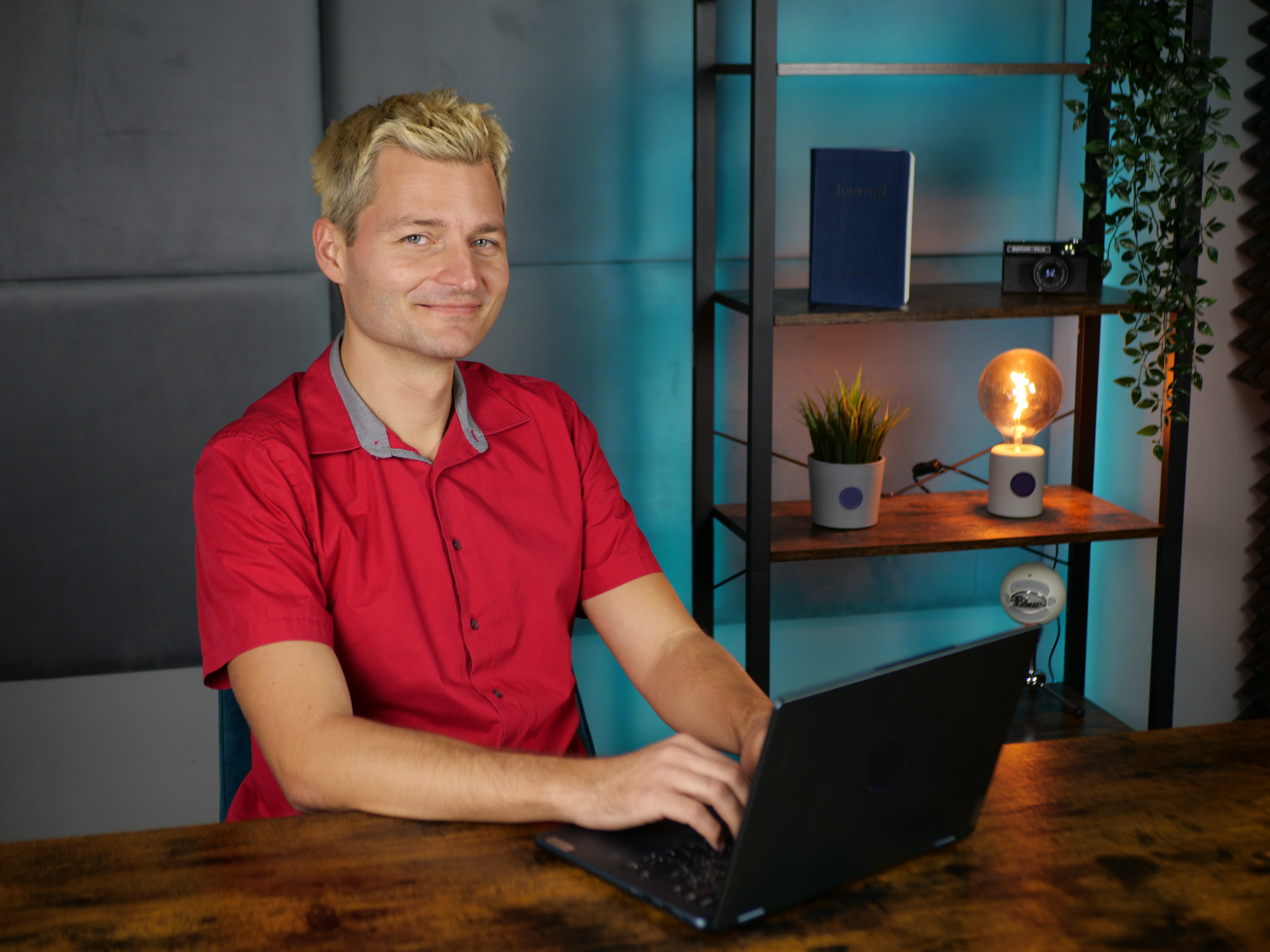
Example of completed three-point lighting setup
