= Quattron =

LCD color display technology

Quattron is the brand name of an LCD color display technology produced by Sharp Electronics. In addition to the standard RGB (red, green, and blue) color subpixels, the technology utilizes a yellow fourth color subpixel (RGBY) which Sharp claims increases the range of displayable colors, and which may mimic more closely the way the brain processes color information. The screen is a form of multi-primary color display, other forms of which have been developed in parallel to Sharp's version.

The technology is used in Sharp's Aquos LCD TV product line, particularly in models with screens 40 inches across and larger. It was at first introduced as “sub-pixel color technology” and then later coined into Quattron technology by Linda Lim from Sharp Malaysia. The technology, distinct from the product line, has been advertised featuring George Takei as the spokesperson in the debut commercial, in which he uses his catchphrase "Oh My". Another commercial had Takei advertising the 3-D model with the Minions from the 2010 movie Despicable Me. In Malaysia, the famous tagline was “4C has arrived, 3C is over” mimicking the attention of 4G technology trend at that moment, but was actually referring to its advanced color technology. The later version was known as Quattron Pro with further subdivided pixels applied to its HDTV range.

== Reception ==
=== Analysis ===
According to an analysis by Raymond Soneira, president of DisplayMate Technologies, a video calibration equipment producer, the industry-standard color spaces used by content providers mean there is no existing source material that contains the fourth color channel. He therefore concludes that any "extra" colors displayed must be created in the television itself through video processing, resulting in exaggerated, less accurate color.

Spectral response of a common Quattron display. The white response was compared with each of the four primaries, given by the respective colored lines. Yellow light produced by the display turns out to be simply the sum of the light that passes through the red pixel and the green pixel.

Color researchers at Queen Mary University of London investigated the Quattron technology and found that although Quattron does have four physical color sub-pixels, it does not have a fourth primary in the backlight to drive it (yellow is approximately 575 nm). In other words, Quattron has a yellow sub-pixel to let light through, but the manufacturer has not made any provision to produce the yellow light needed to pass through it. (The yellow subpixel merely lets through more red and green light.) On that basis they conclude that it serves no useful function.

== See also ==
- Color depth
- Gamut
- Opponent process, a color theory which considers yellow a primary color in addition to the classic RGB color model
- PenTile matrix family (RGB reproduction via alternated RG/BG, RG/BW, etc.)
- RGBE filter – a Bayer filter with "emerald" as a 4th color
- Hexachrome, a system for printing with six colours
- Tetrachromacy, a different biological system from trichromacy, theorized to exist in some humans
- Trichromacy, scientific description of the RGB model for human vision
