= LCD television =

Television set with liquid-crystal display

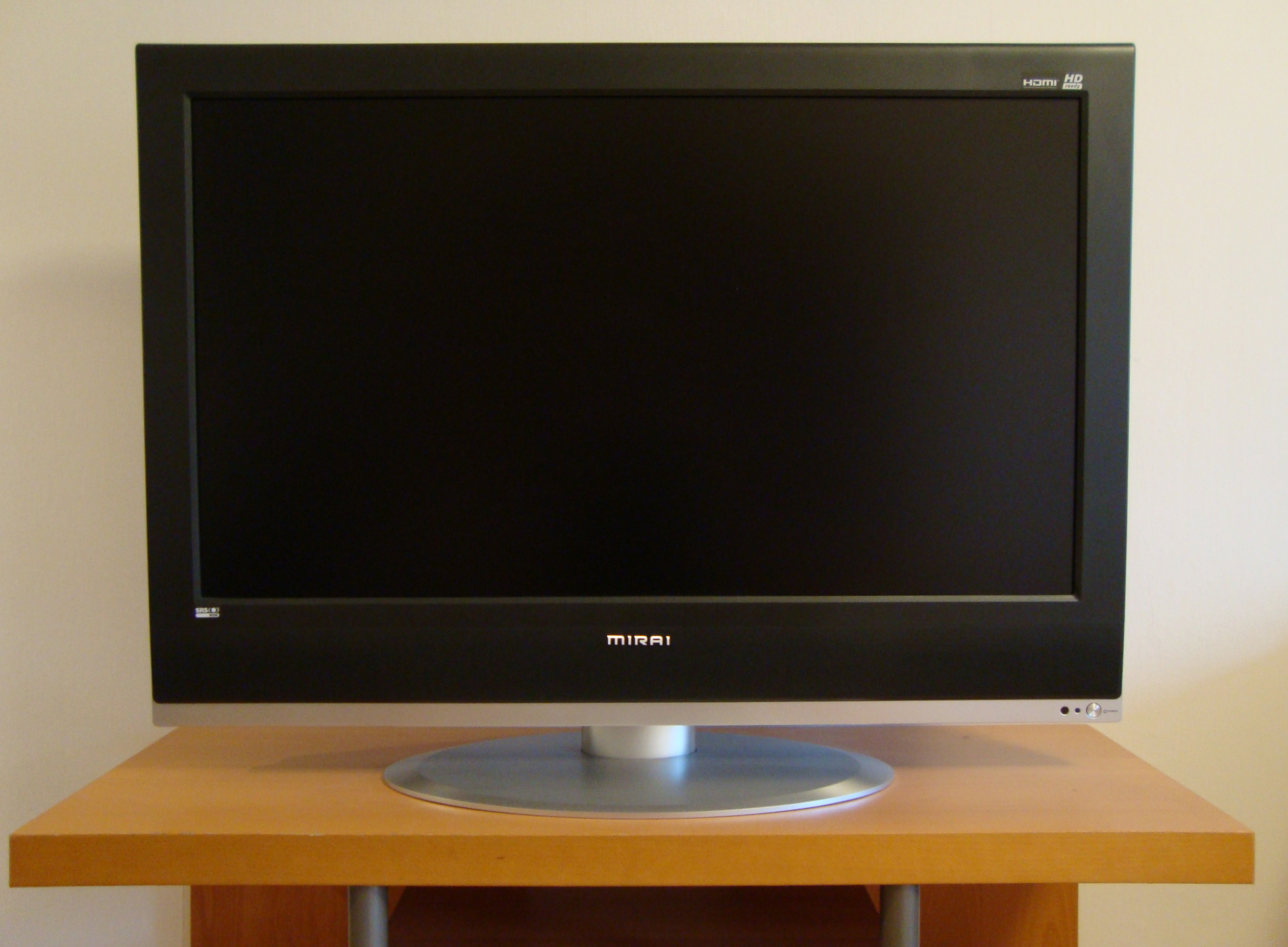
An LCD TV (Late 2000s)

A liquid-crystal-display television (LCD TV) is a television set that uses a liquid-crystal display to produce images. It is by far the most widely produced and sold type of television display.

LCD TVs rose in popularity in the early years of the 21st century, and exceeded sales of cathode-ray-tube televisions worldwide from late 2007 on. Sales of CRT TVs dropped rapidly after that, as did sales of competing technologies such as plasma display panels and rear-projection television. This was partly because LCD TVs were thin and light, and used less power than plasma, although they had some disadvantages such as poorer contrast ratio and inferior color gamut. Further development of LCD TVs have improved them to far exceed the capabilities of older sets.

== History ==
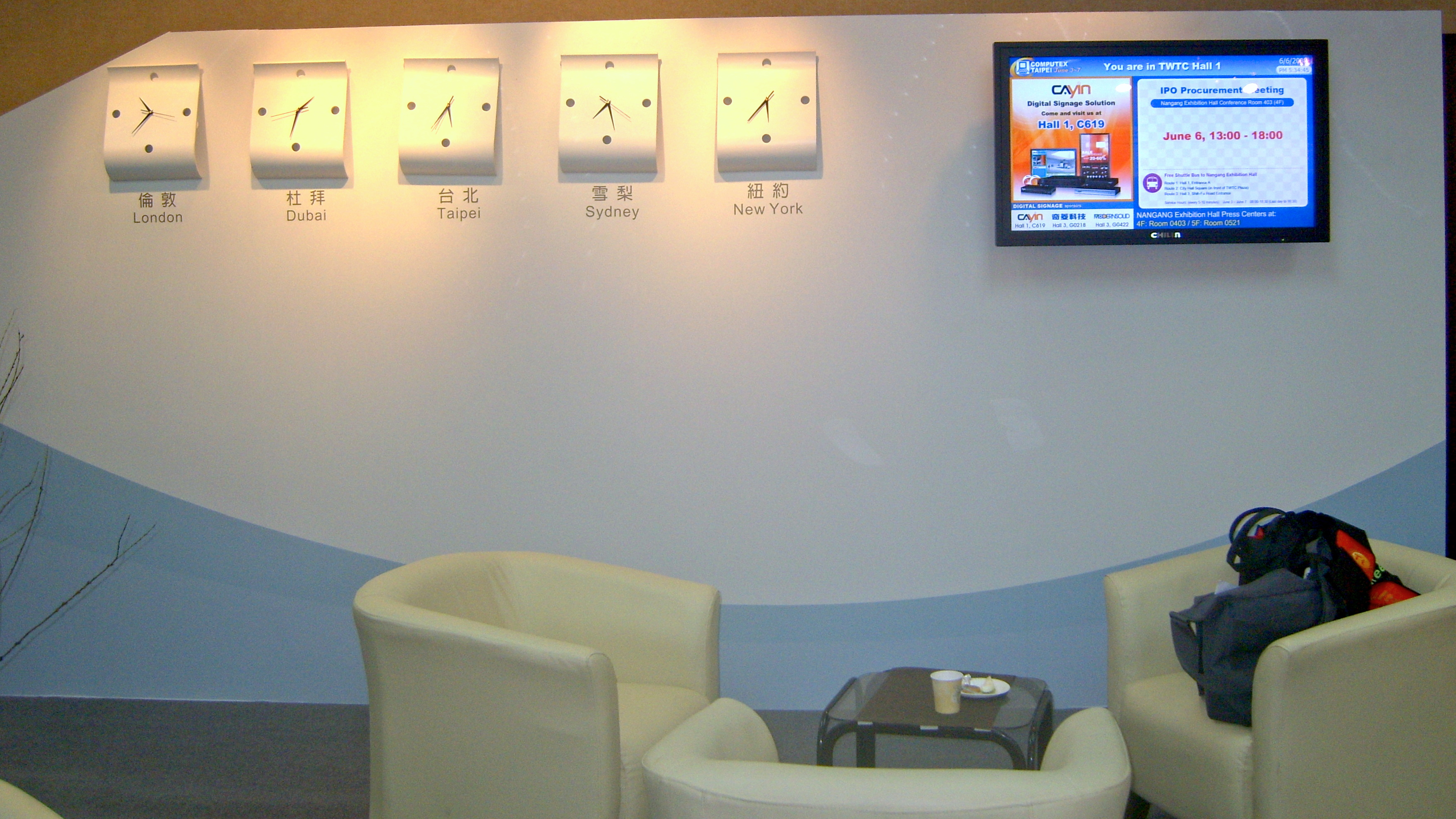
An LCD TV hanging on a wall in the Taipei World Trade Center during the Computex Taipei show in 2008

=== Early efforts ===
Passive matrix LCDs first became common as portable computer displays in the 1980s, competing for market share with plasma displays. The LCDs had very slow refresh rates that blurred the screen even with scrolling text, but their light weight and low cost were major benefits. Screens using reflective LCDs required no internal light source, making them particularly well-suited to laptop computers. Refresh rates of early devices were too slow to be useful for television.

Portable televisions were a target application for LCDs. LCDs consumed far less battery power than even the miniature tubes used in portable televisions of the era. In 1980, Hattori Seiko's R&D group began development on color LCD pocket televisions. In 1982, Seiko Epson released the first LCD television, the Epson TV Watch, a small wrist-worn active-matrix LCD television. Sharp Corporation introduced the dot matrix TN-LCD in 1983, and Casio introduced its TV-10 portable TV. In 1984, Epson released the ET-10, the first full-color pocket LCD television. That same year Citizen Watch introduced the Citizen Pocket TV, a 2.7-inch color LCD TV, with the first commercial TFT LCD.

Throughout this period, screen sizes over 30" were rare, as these formats would start to appear blocky at normal seating distances when viewed on larger screens. LCD projection systems were generally limited to situations where the image had to be viewed by a larger audience. At the same time, plasma displays could easily offer the performance needed to make a high-quality display, but suffered from low brightness and very high power consumption. Still, some experimentation with LCD televisions took place during this period. In 1988, Sharp introduced a 14-inch active-matrix full-color full-motion TFT-LCD. These were offered primarily as high-end items and were not aimed at the general market. This led to Japan launching an LCD industry, which developed larger-size LCDs, including TFT computer monitors and LCD televisions. Epson developed the 3LCD projection technology in the 1980s, and licensed it for use in projectors in 1988. Epson's VPJ-700, released in January 1989, was the world's first compact, full-color LCD projector. The first wall-mountable TV used LCD technology and was introduced by Sharp Corporation in 1992.

=== Market takeover ===
The mass market LCD television took off in 2001 after Sharp's launch of the Aquos range. Within a short period of time, older televisions were quickly seen as outdated and bulky, whereas LCDs gradually emerged as genuine capable yet affordable contenders to consumers. In 2006, LCD prices started to fall rapidly and their screen sizes increased, although plasma televisions maintained a slight edge in picture quality and a price advantage for sets at the critical 42" size and larger. By late 2006, several vendors were offering 42" LCDs, albeit at a premium price, encroaching upon plasma's only stronghold. More decisively, LCDs offered higher resolutions and true 1080p support, while plasmas were stuck at 720p, which made up for the price difference.

Predictions that prices for LCDs would rapidly drop through 2007 led to a wait-and-see attitude in the market, and sales of all large-screen televisions stagnated while customers watched to see if this would happen. Plasmas and LCDs reached price parity in 2007, with the LCD's higher resolution being a 'winning point' for many sales. By late 2007, it was clear plasmas would lose out to LCDs during the critical Christmas sales season. This was in spite of plasmas continuing to hold an image quality advantage, but as the president of Chunghwa Picture Tubes noted after shutting down their plasma production line, "(g)lobally, so many companies, so many investments, so many people have been working in this area, on this product. So they can improve so quickly."

When the sales figures for the 2007 Christmas season were finally tallied, analysts were surprised to find that LCD TVs had outsold both plasma and CRT TVs. This development drove competing large-screen systems from the market almost overnight. Plasma had overtaken rear-projection systems in 2005. The same was true for CRTs, which lasted only a few months longer; Sony shut down the final plant in March 2008. The February 2009 announcement that Pioneer Electronics was ending production of the plasma screens was widely considered the tipping point in that technology's history as well.

LCD's dominance in the television market accelerated rapidly. It was the only technology that could scale both up and down in size, covering both the high-end market for large screens in the 40 to 50" class, as well as customers looking to replace their existing smaller CRT sets in the 14 to 30" range. Building across these wide scales quickly pushed the prices down across the board.

In 2008, LCD TV shipments were up 33 percent year-on-year compared to 2007 to 105 million units. In 2009, LCD TV shipments raised to 146 million units (69% of the total of 211 million TV shipments). In 2010, LCD TV shipments reached 187.9 million units (from an estimated total of 247 million TV shipments).

Larger size displays continued to be released throughout the decade:

- In October 2004, Sharp announced the successful manufacture of a 65" panel.
- In March 2005, Samsung announced an 82" LCD panel.
- In 2006, LG.Philips LCD announced a 100" LCD television
- In January 2007, Sharp displayed a 108" LCD panel under the AQUOS brand name at CES in Las Vegas.

=== Competing systems ===
In spite of LCD's dominance of the television field, other technologies continued to be developed to address its shortcomings. Whereas LCDs produce an image by selectively blocking a backlight, organic LED, microLED, field-emission display and surface-conduction electron-emitter display technologies all produce an illuminated image directly. In comparison to LCDs, all of these technologies offer better viewing angles, much higher brightness and contrast ratio (as much as 5,000,000:1), and better color saturation and accuracy. They also use less power, and in theory, they are less complex and less expensive to build.

Manufacturing these screens proved to be more difficult than originally thought, however. Sony abandoned their field-emission display project in March 2009, but continued to work on OLED sets. Canon continued development of its surface-conduction electron-emitter display technology, but announced it would not attempt to introduce sets to market for the foreseeable future.

Samsung announced that 14.1 and 31 inch OLED sets were "production ready" at the SID 2009 trade show in San Antonio.

== See also ==
- Ambilight, Philips Electronics technology
- Comparison of CRT, LCD, plasma, and OLED displays
- Large-screen television technology
- Pixel Plus
- Quattron, an LCD TV technology from Sharp, which utilizes a fourth pixel color, yellow
- Thin-film-transistor liquid-crystal display (TFT LCD), a detailed discussion of LCD-panel technology
