= Multi-primary color display =

Display that can reproduce a wider gamut color than conventional displays

Multi-primary color (MPC) display is a display that can reproduce a wider gamut of colors than conventional displays. In addition to the standard RGB (red, green, and blue) color subpixels, the technology utilizes additional colors, such as yellow, magenta and cyan, and thus increases the range of displayable colors.

Sharp's Quattron is the brand name of an LCD color display technology that utilizes a yellow fourth color subpixel. It is used in Sharp's Aquos LCD TV product line, particularly in models with screens 40 inches across and larger.
