= SmartLink (television) =

Proprietary wireless transmission standard

SmartLink was the trademark name for a proprietary technology by Sharp Corporation for wireless transmission of television signals. The system involved two devices, each a little bit bigger than a paperback book: one attached to a television screen and the other was hooked up to a TV tuner, DVD player, or any playback device. The video information was transmitted wirelessly using the 802.11b wireless standard, allowing the playback device to be up to 98 feet (30 m) away from the television screen.

The SmartLink system was to go on sale in Japan on August 3, 2001, at a list price of $400 (727 present day US dollars).

SmartLink was incorporated into Sharp's Wireless AQUOS television, model LC-15L1U-S.
