= Toshiyuki Kita =

Japanese industrial designer

Toshiyuki Kita (喜多 俊之) is a furniture and product designer. He was born in 1942, in Osaka, Japan. In 2004 he was inaugurated as a professor at the Osaka University of Arts.

== Career ==
Kita’s earliest pieces, the Wink Chair and the Kick Table, are currently in the permanent collections of the New York City Museum of Modern Art and Hamburg, Germany's Museum fur Kunst und Gewerbe.

Kita has served as a governmental advisor to Singapore, Thailand, and China for their country's revitalization of its design resources. He has been very active in revitalizing and promoting local Japanese traditional crafts and industries.

He was producer of the international trade fair for home and lifestyle renovation "Living & Design" and a proponent of Japanese lifestyle renovation, the "RENOVETTA" project. In 2015, his invitational exhibition “Il Lusso Della Natura” was held at Chiesa San Domenico Church in Alba, Italy.

== Awards and honors ==
Kita has received multiple international awards, including the 1990 "Delta de Oro (Gold Prize)" Award of Spain, and the ADI prize "carrier Internazionale of Compasso d'Oro" of Italy in 2011 and in 2024.

He was bestowed with the honorary title of Commendatore by the Italian Republic in 2017.

== Publications ==
Kita’s recent publications include "Power of Design" (Nikkei Publishing Inc., 2007), "Local Industry + Design" (Gakugei Shuppan-Sha, 2009), and "Venture for Design 1969 - Why I Went to Italy to Design" (Gakugei Shuppan-Sha, 2012).

His DVD Made with Heart and Soul, a 20-minute documentary on his 40 years of collaboration with various local Japanese traditional arts and craftsmanship, was awarded the Gold Prize of World Media Festival 2012 (Public Relations/Culture) at Hamburg, Germany, in 2012.
