= Backlighting (lighting design) =

Form of illumination

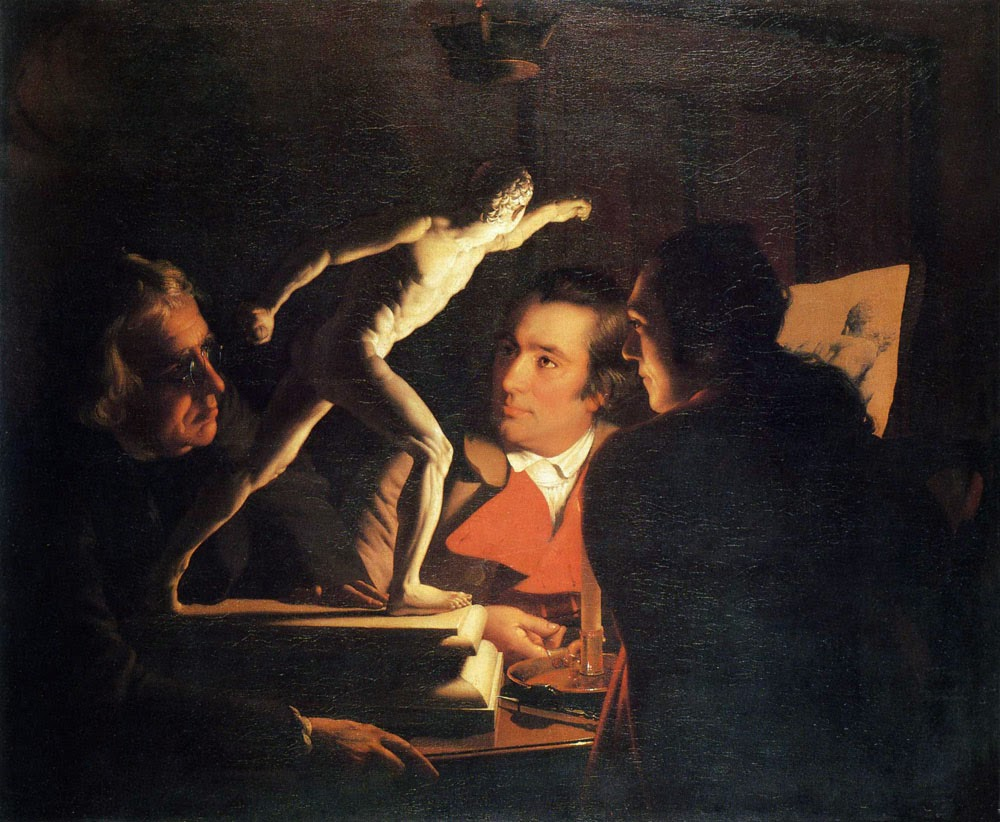
Three Persons viewing the Borghese Gladiator by candlelight, by Joseph Wright of Derby, 1765

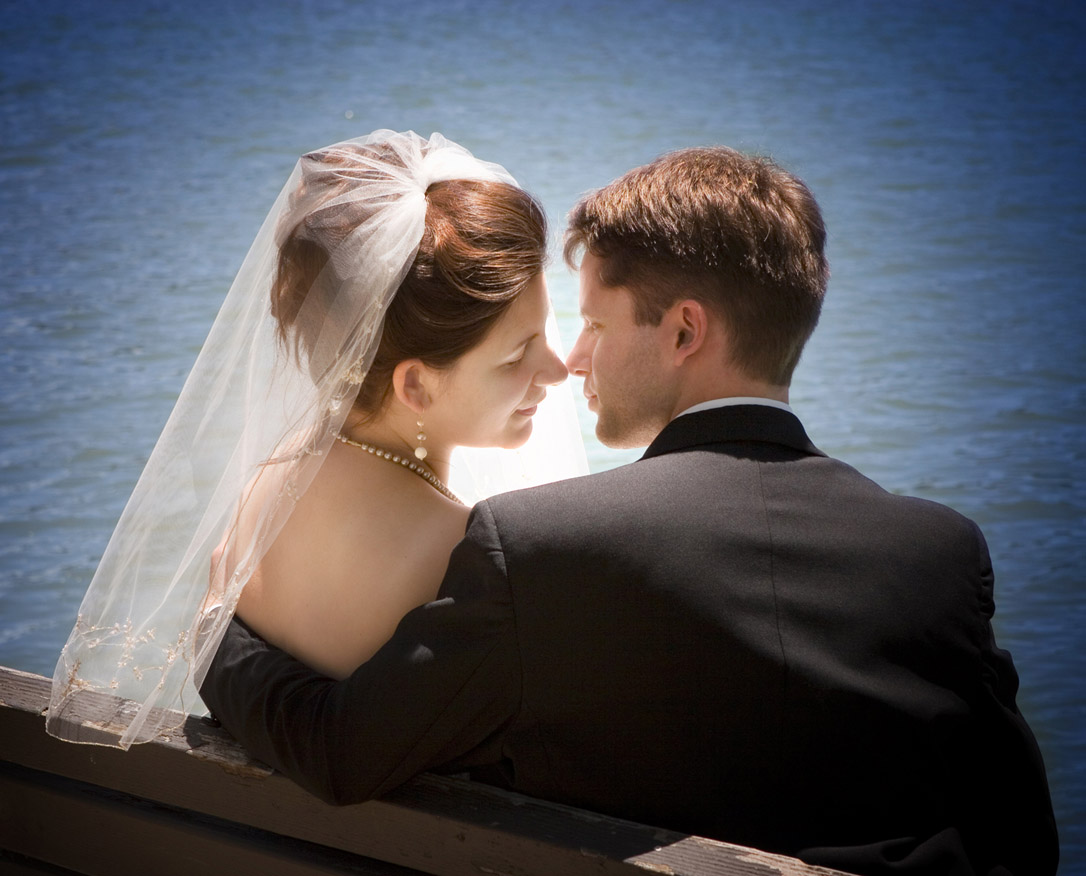
Using backlighting, this portrait is improved by not allowing the harsh sunlight to cast hot spots on the faces and by ringing the couple with an outlining effect, thus separating them from the background. A fill flash on the camera adds the required uniform illumination to the areas shaded from the sun.

In lighting design, backlighting is the process of illuminating the subject from the back. In other words, the lighting instrument and the viewer face each other, with the subject in between. This creates a glowing effect on the edges of the subject, while other areas are darker. The backlight can be a natural or artificial source of light. When artificial, the back light is usually placed directly behind the subject in a 4-point lighting setup. A back light, which lights foreground elements from the rear, is not to be confused with a background light, which lights background elements (such as scenery).

In the context of lighting design, the back light is sometimes called hair or shoulder light, because when lighting an actor or an actress, backlighting makes the edges of the subject's hair glow if the hair is fuzzy. This can create an angelic halo type effect around the head. Filmmakers sometimes use this to show that the actor is good or pure. Television productions often use this effect in soap operas, where it has become something of a cliché of the genre. It is also sometimes called the kicker or rim light.

Backlighting helps separate the subject and the background. Live theatre lighting designs often use backlighting to give a more three-dimensional appearance to actors or set elements, when front lighting alone would give a flat, two-dimensional look. In chiaroscuro effects in painting, such as the candlelit paintings by Joseph Wright of Derby (illustration), backlighting helps separate subjects in the foreground and emphasizes depth.

In photography, a back light (often the sun) that is about sixteen times more intense than the key light produces a silhouette. A fill flash used with a backlit subject yields more even lighting.

The vertical angle of the back light can change the effect. A low angle can make the light hit the camera lens, causing lens flare. A high angle can make the subject's nose extend out from the mostly vertical shadow of the head, producing a potentially unwanted highlight in the middle of the face.

== See also ==
- Chiaroscuro
- Contre-jour
