= Contre-jour =

Photographic technique

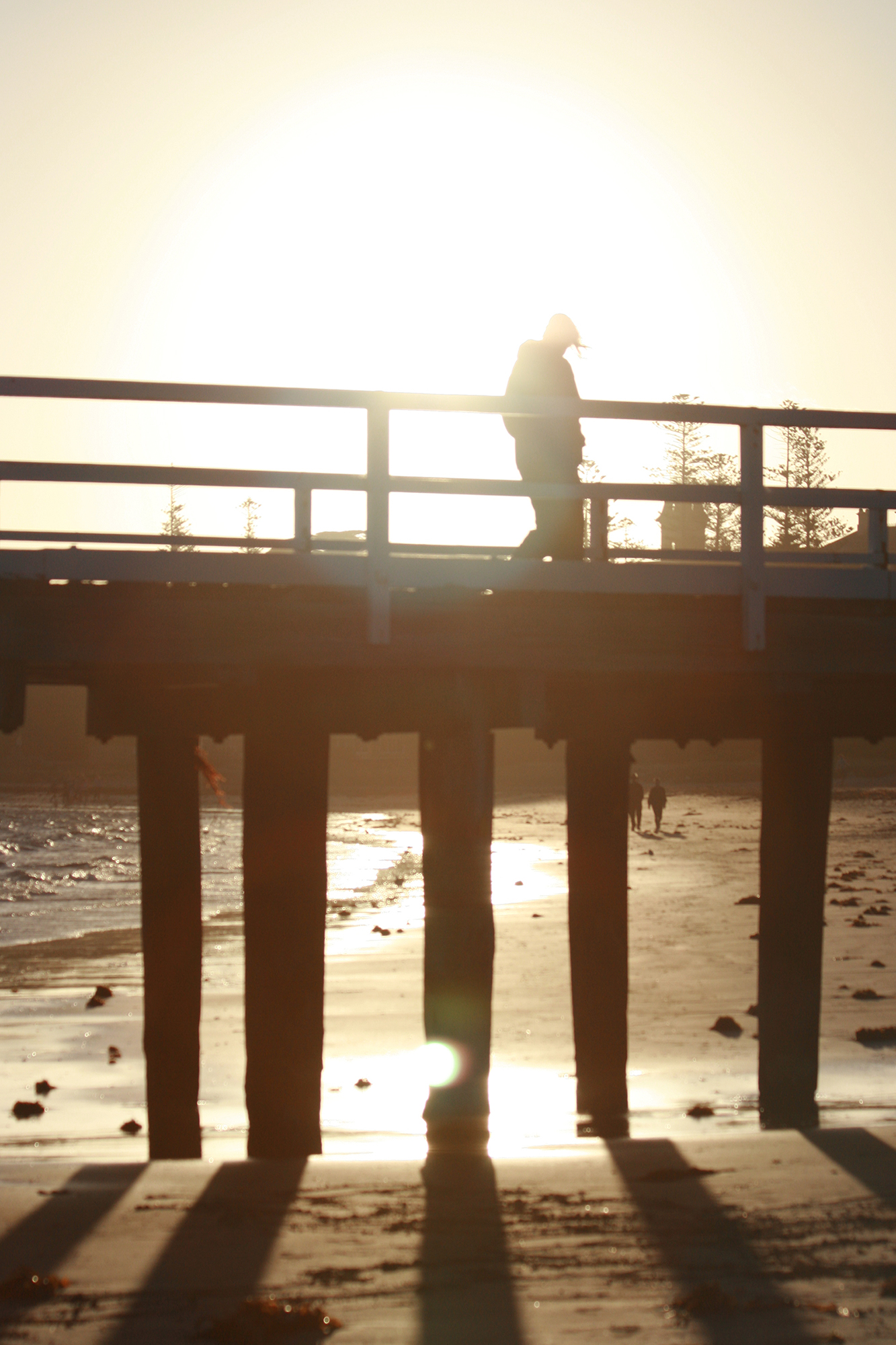
Contre-jour photo taken directly against the setting sun, causing loss of subject detail and colour, and emphasis of shapes and lines. Medium: Colour digital image.

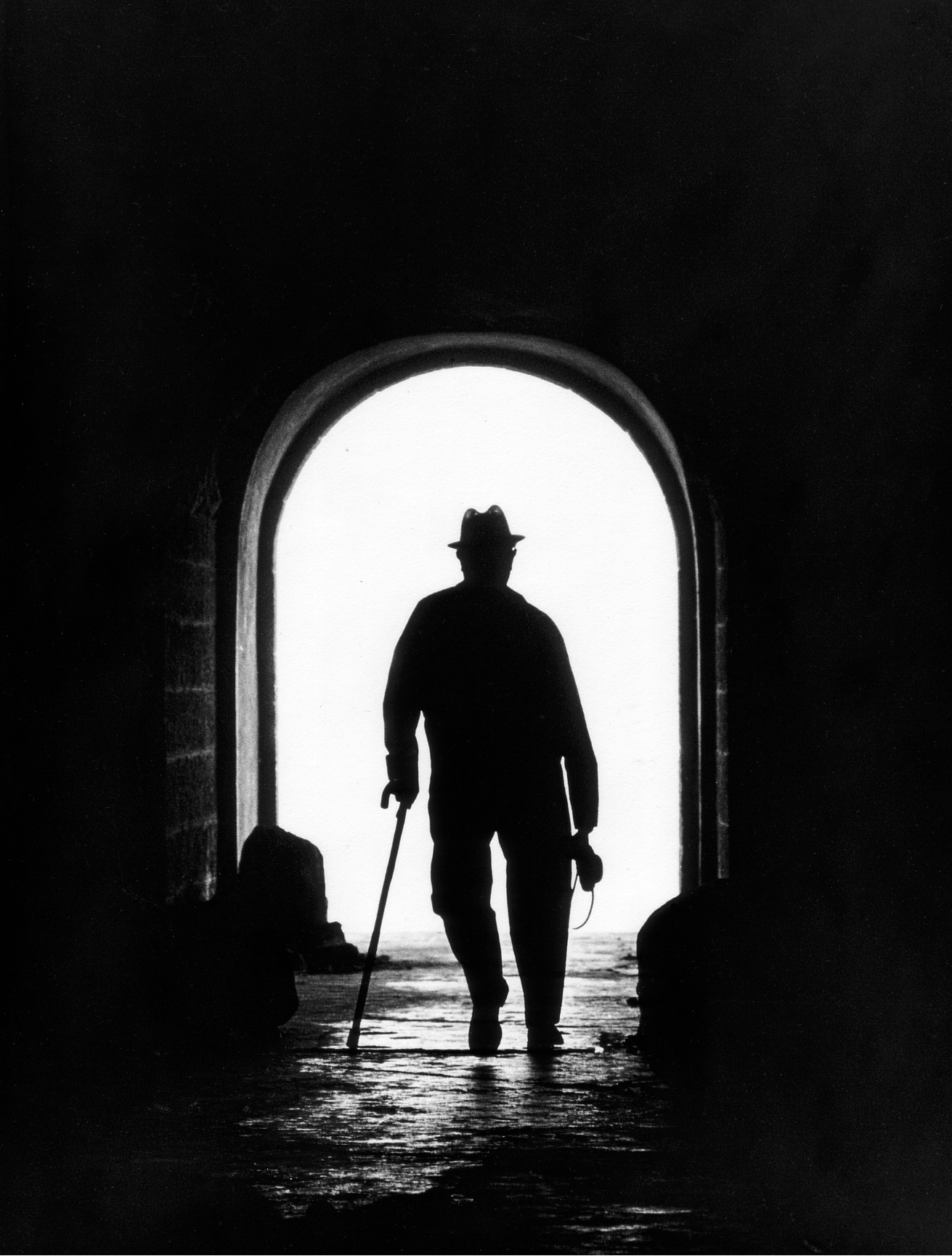
Contre-jour emphasizes the outline of the man and the tunnel entrance. The ground reflections show the position of the man. Medium: Digital scan from B&W paper print.

Contre-jour (French pronunciation: [kɔ̃tʁə ʒuʁ]; lit. 'against daylight') is a photographic technique in which the camera is pointing directly toward a source of light, as well as an equivalent technique in painting.

== Description ==
Before its use in photography, contre-jour was used in painting, where the shadows would fall to the left on the left, to the right on the right and forward in the lower centre. The edges of the subject would show surprising colour effects.

Contre-jour produces backlighting of the subject. This effect usually hides details, causes a stronger contrast between light and dark, creates silhouettes and emphasizes lines and shapes. The sun, or other light source, is often seen as either a bright spot or as a strong glare behind the subject. Fill light may be used to illuminate the side of the subject facing toward the camera. The subject is generally considered silhouetted when there is a lighting ratio of 16:1 or more.

== See also ==
- Forward scatter
- High dynamic range
