= Belweder (TV set) =

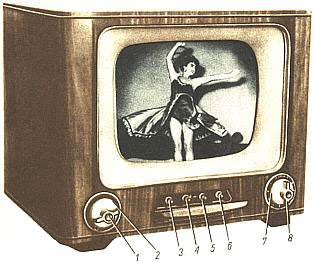
Belweder - front view: 1. power switch / volume 2. brightness 3. pitch 4. vertical synchro / 5. horizontal synchro 6. contrast 7. channel tuning 8. channel switch

Belweder was the brand name of the OT1471 television set, manufactured in People's Republic of Poland (PRL) from 1957 to 1960 at the Warszawskie Zakłady Telewizyjne (WZT). It was the second (after the Wisła) TV set made in Poland and the first one designed entirely domestically.

The communist authorities of the PRL saw TV set manufacturing not only as satisfying the consumption needs of the citizens, but also a way of popularizing a potentially powerful propaganda medium, which is why the development of television in general and the TV sets in particular enjoyed strong support within the reality of a centrally planned economy.

The first plans for the new device, along with laboratory model, were created at the WZT in 1955. Contrary to WZT's first product, the Wisła, which was to a large extent based on solutions licensed from the Soviet Union with many components imported from there, the new TV was to be a modern design using domestic technology only, even though many of the components of the Belweder have not been manufactured in Poland before, and the manufacturing of plastics had to be set up virtually from scratch.

The resulting TV set had a 14-inch screen, external dimensions of 51x41x34 cm and weighed 23 kg. It could receive up to eight TV channels and FM radio. The channel switch could only be set to receive a signal from the transmitters in the part of Poland where a given example was sold - there were two distinct versions, one for the southern and northern part of Poland. A Belweder cost 7000 złoty at the time when the average monthly salary was between one and two thousand, yet, like many consumption goods in the communist economies, it proved very sought after and hard to buy. This seems strange to Westerners used to free market economies; the explanation is that although the TV set cost a few monthly salaries, communist economies produced so little in the way of consumer goods that people normally had vast amounts of money saved, simply because there was nothing else to buy. Accordingly, demand constantly outpaced supply (remember that centrally planned economies, lacking a private sector, did not naturally increase supply to meet demand or raise prices to reduce demand). In 1958, production reached 60,000 items.

Later, the Belweder and Wisła were joined by more modern models, the Wawel (named after the Wawel Castle) and the "gems" family - Turkus (turquoise), Jantar (amber) and Szmaragd (emerald). Those models gradually superseded the older, and still unreliable, Wisła and Belweder, and in the 1960 the production of all types of TV sets at WZT reached 200,000. The "gems" were later superseded by the "planet" series, beginning with the popular Neptun (Neptune). With over 150,000 items sold in total, the Belweder can be credited with making television a popular medium in Poland for the first time.
