= Central Research Laboratories =

- EMI Laboratories
- Location within Greater London
- Alternative names: CRL, Scipher

General information
- Type: Research laboratory
- Location: Dawley Road, Middlesex, UB3 1BR
- Coordinates: 51.508°N 0.43°W
- Elevation: 35 m (115 ft)
- Demolished: 2010
- Client: EMI
- Owner: EMI

Technical details
- Floor count: 2

The Central Research Laboratories, often referred to as CRL, was a British research laboratory that originally belonged to the EMI Corporation.

== History ==
During the period of 1927–29 EMI invested in developing a research and innovation centre that arguably set the tone for many of the technological advancements that would occur over the next 80 years in the UK and was held in extremely high regard globally.

After years operating in central London and across various greater London locations, a new company site was built in the 1980s in Hayes, Middlesex. Hayes was often referred to as EMI Town, due to the presence of various company businesses, including the Gramophone Company HQ, which later became known as HMV. The lab's first director was Isaac Shoenberg, a pioneer of television.

In 1996 the company formally became known as CRL Ltd after a management buy-out, in which EMI retained a nominal ownership.

The company's business model became that of an incubator, that effectively funded innovations and research projects and once the products became 'viable', they were established into standalone subsidiary companies, that typically continued to operate out of their HQ office.

In the year 2000, the company floated under a new parent company name Scipher Plc, which for the next two years was the UK's most admired and valuable tech stock on the FTSE 250 index.

The Scipher brand included:

- CRL – This remained the heart of the business. It continued to act as the innovation centre of the business and initiated numerous ongoing research projects and initiatives. It also retained control of the majority of the existing products and technologies that had been developed where commercial agreements already existed. It also continued with Ministry of Defence (MoD) projects, which remained private under official secrecy obligations.
- QED – An intellectual Property (IP) business that proactively registered and managed new and old patents for its parent company and third-parties, and also offered an infringement investigation and litigation service for companies that felt their patents had been infringed. This alone resulted in millions of pounds of revenue being generated from the patents CRL had inherited as part of the management buy-out from EMI.
- Sensaura Technology – Originally a research project within CRL and then formed as a separate company in 1998, 'Sensaura 3D positional audio' and 'virtualisation technology', was at one point licensed and appeared on over 250 million hardware devices worldwide, including laptops, PCs, sound cards and headphones. The technology was also developed into a middleware software solution, named GameCODA, that was licensed directly to the computer gaming development sector (including Lucas Art, Hasbro, Rock Star Games, Criterion), so special effects and sounds could be built directly into their games for the first time. Sensaura 3D positional audio also appeared on the first Microsoft Xbox and later on the Sony PlayStation and Nintendo Wii. The company also won the coveted MacRobert Award for technology and as a result had an exhibition display within the London Science Museum between 2001 and 2002. Sensaura Technology was acquired by US giant Creative Labs in late 2003 and the technology was absorbed into their product portfolio, effectively neutralising the company brand.

=== Company Decline ===
After the Scipher company flotation, many key long-serving staff members started to exercise their extensive share options as they matured and took early retirement. This resulted in the loss of much of the intellectual resource that the company relied upon. The outcome of this, alongside the sale of the 'darling' Sensaura Technology division to global giant Creative Labs, heavily impacted on the company's strategic road map and also had a catastrophic effect on the company's stock market perception – and hence its share price.

Scipher Plc very quickly slipped into a difficult position that resulted in the company going into liquidation in 2006.

During liquidation process much of the coveted IP and patents that the company owned were sold to technology and manufacturing companies in what one scientific journal referred to as a 'Yard Sale'. This subsequently enabled many to these purchasers to become and extend their positions as market leaders and generate significant business successes and profits.

=== CRL Reborn ===
After the demise of Scipher Plc many questions were asked about how an historic organisation like CRL was allowed collapse and disappear so easily. Many senior individuals within the scientific and engineering sectors openly referred to it as 'a travesty' that should have been avoided.

In 2016, a private investment organisation, with the support of Brunel University London and HEFCE, the Central Research Laboratory was reborn in the form of an innovation incubation centre, only a stone's throw from the previous CRL site in Hayes. Some of CRL's previous employees were invited to the site for the occasion.

== Innovations ==
CRL was responsible for either developing or initiating many innovations including:

- The EMI 405-line television system, adopted by the BBC, was developed at the site, with early television cameras developed by Australian James Dwyer McGee, and William Francis Tedham (1902–2000), first patented in May 1932
- The development of the CAT (CT) scanner
- Early airborne radars such as H2S.
- Stereo sound and numerous audio mixing technologies
- The commercialisation of television through CRT improvement
- Early Liquid Crystal Display (LCD) technology
- 3D audio virtualisation technology
- Magnetic technology that was applied to the first commercially used credit cards globally
- It also undertook numerous undisclosed innovation MoD projects.

The company also registered early patents and intellectual property rights that are now commonly utilised in technologies worldwide, including:

- Finger print technology
- Eye retina scanning technologies
- Other software and digital technologies that are common place in many everyday product today relating to the internet and application development.

The company as so received many awards over the years including the Institute of Physics Fernand Holweck Medal and Prize, in 1986.

== Chief scientists ==
- 1986-94, Prof Ian Shanks FRS, he invented the glucose meter in 1982 at Unilever Colworth, which won the Russ Prize in 2025

== Location ==
The last company site is east of the A437, north-west of M4 junction 3.

In the 1990s, the site became known as CRL. It is situated next to the EMI Archive Trust.

== See also ==
- BBC Research & Development
- 1942 Herefordshire TRE Halifax crash
- Allen Clark Research Centre, owned by Plessey in Northamptonshire
- Philips Research Laboratories, Cross Oak Lane, Redhill, Surrey
- Philips Natuurkundig Laboratorium now High Tech Campus Eindhoven
- Thorn-EMI Defence Systems Division at Feltham, which was penetrated by KGB spy Michael John Smith (espionage), being arrested in August 1992
