= Bias lighting =

Illumination of the surface behind displays

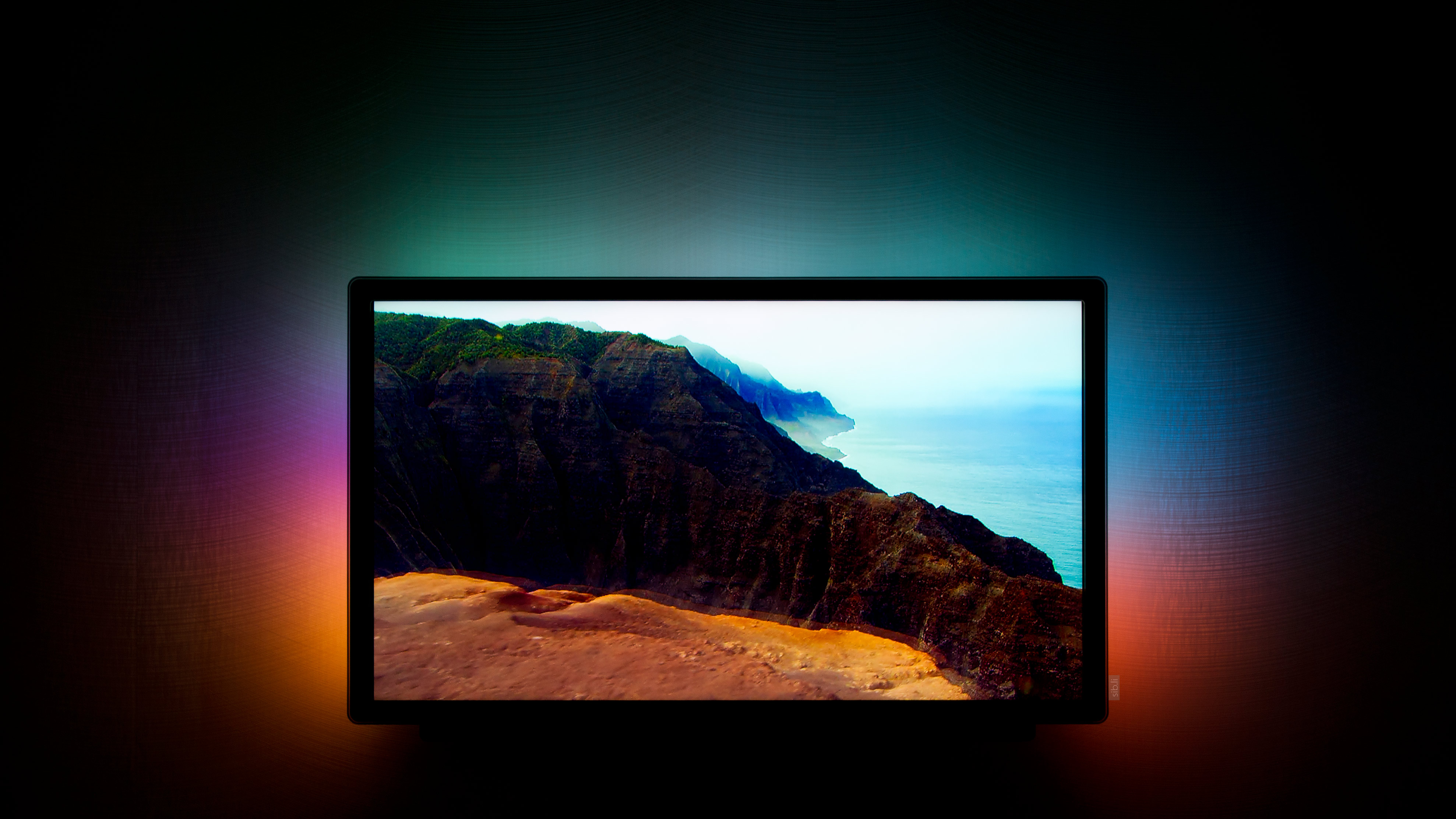
A flat-panel television set with colored bias lighting

Video of a bias lighting system with an LED strip light mounted all around the edges at the rear side of the television set, plus two extra lamps (sidekicks) below for illuminating a larger area

In home cinema and video editing technology, bias lighting is a weak light source on the backside of a screen or monitor that illuminates the wall or surface behind and just around the display.

== Motivation ==
The purpose of bias lighting is to reduce the perceived brightness of the display as a result of the contrast with the slightly illuminated area around it. This reduces the eye strain and fatigue that occurs when viewing a bright display against a very dark background for an extended time, and increases the perceived blackness, perceived highlights, and overall contrast of the display.

== History ==
Bias lighting has been used since the early days of television in the form of "TV lamps", often taking the shape of an animal, that were set atop television sets and projected light onto the wall behind the set.

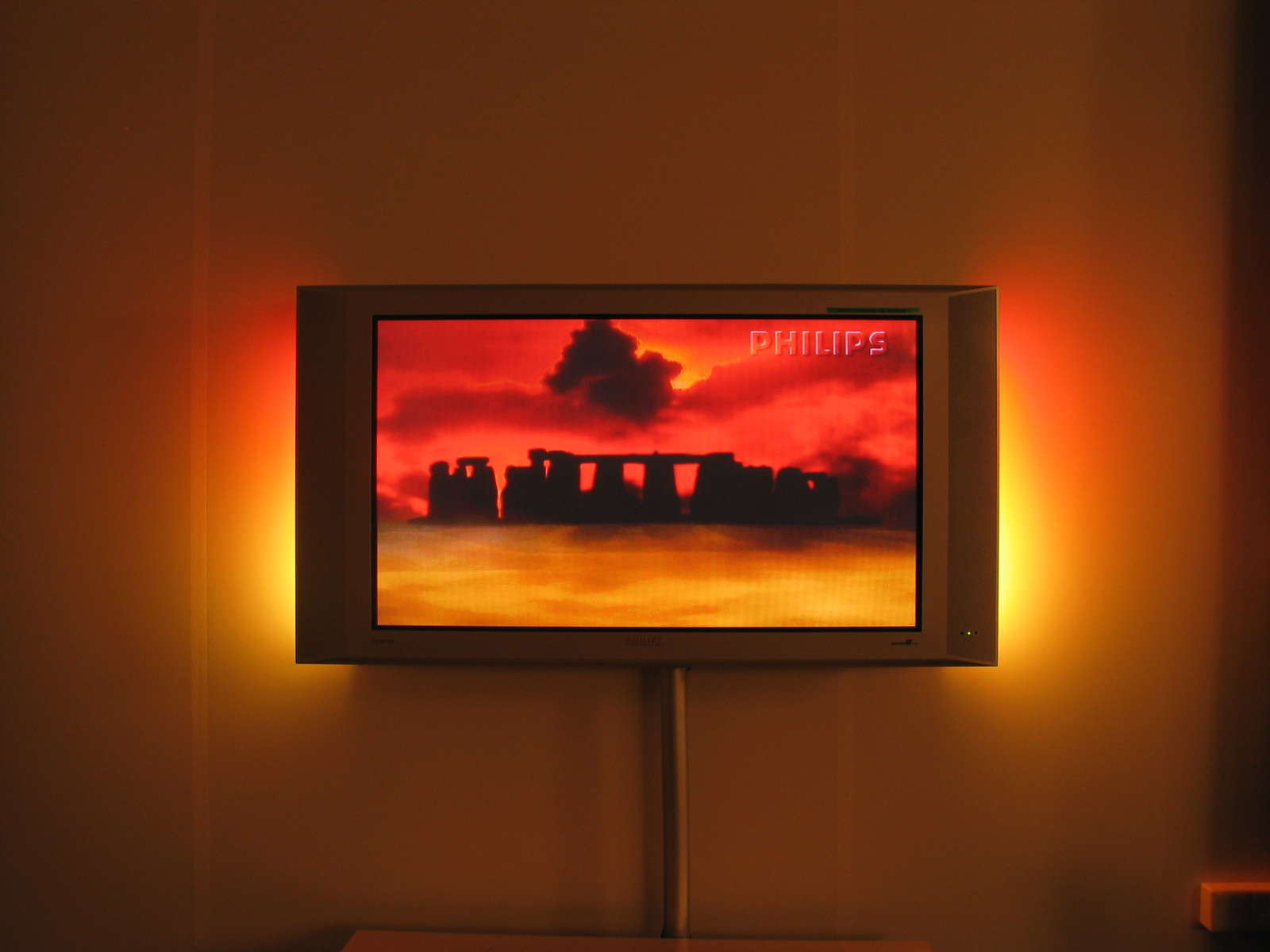
Philips Ambilight prototype TV from 2003

In 2002, Philips Consumer Electronics developed and patented a lighting system that allowed the background illumination to follow the brightness and color of the TV image. In addition to reducing the brightness-contrast of the image with the background, this also extended the image across the wall, making it appear larger. This system was integrated into a LCD TV and introduced to the market in 2004 under the name “Ambilight”.

Early forms of this system used individual red, green, and blue CCFL tubes. As of the 2010s, bias lights often use LEDs instead, attached to the backside of flat-panel displays, and draw power from a USB port. Some bias lighting kits even use a webcam pointed at a TV or monitor screen to read colors and change television backlights accordingly.

== Color temperature ==
Bias lights with a color temperature of 6,500 K match the temperature of most monitors' white color, which is derived from the CIE standard illuminant D65. They are used in professional editing environments and are recommended to maximize the fidelity of the perceived image. In home cinema, bias lighting that is no brighter than 10% of the display's brightest spot and with a color rendering index of at least 90 is recommended. There is some debate about the proper brightness levels of bias lighting for HDR content, with SMPTE recommending 4.5 nits and the Imaging Science Foundation recommending 10%, but sometimes as high as 15%.

== See also ==
- Background light, lighting used to illuminate the background area of a set in theatre and film
