= Sharp Aquos =

Product brand name for televisions and screens

AQUOS
- Brand: Sharp
- Type: LCD
- Retail availability: 2001-present
- Related articles: Sharp; Quattron

AQUOS is a product brand name created and owned by Sharp Corporation of Japan for video-related equipment, mainly LCD televisions, component screens, and mobile devices. It encompasses small, portable models up to large home-theater screens, as well as component screens for portable devices including mobile phones.

The Aquos name is a portmanteau of aqua and quality.

== TV of the 21st century ==
Sharp's president Katsuhiko Machida in 1998 bet the company on shifting all its television sets to unproven LCD panels by 2005. The company had a close history with LCD displays, having released the first mass-market LCD calculator back in 1973.

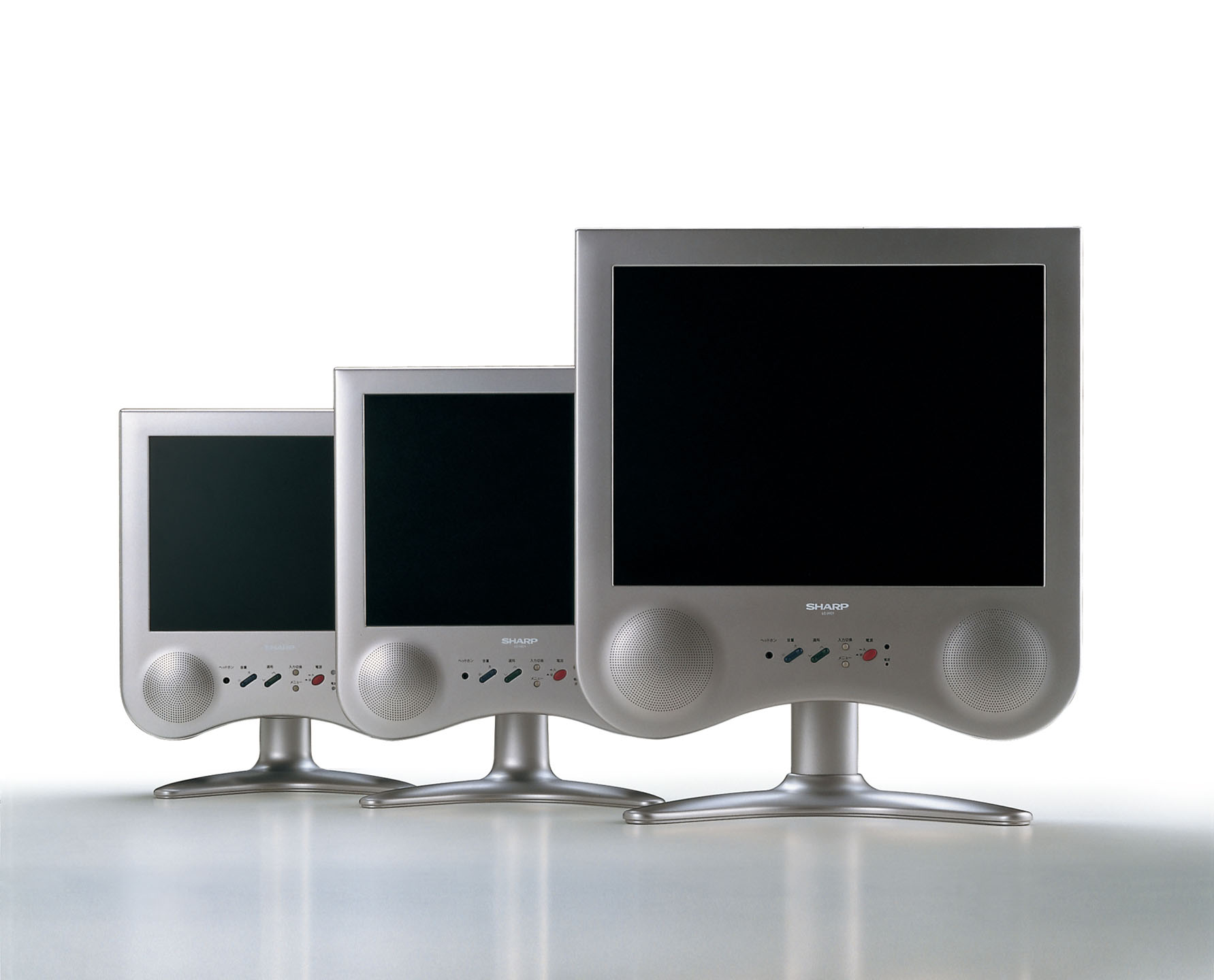
C1 series Aquos designed by Toshiyuki Kita

Sharp released the first Aquos models (LC-20C1, LC-15C1, LC-13C1, 13", 15", and 20" 4:3 sizes respectively) on January 1, 2001. Described by Sharp as the "TV of the 21st century", the Aquos marked the first mass-market LCD flat-panel television sets for home use. Up until that point, TVs were predominantly large and bulky CRTs while flat-panels were limited to luxury expensive PDPs. The C1 series featured a soft and curved metallic-silver look designed by renowned designer Toshiyuki Kita that was also noted for being a fashionable home interior item compared to typical televisions. It also offered an impressive 450 cd/m² panel brightness (CCFL). As a fledging technology, the prices of these models were still higher than the average TV at $1,799.99, $2,999.99, and $4,999.99 respectively.

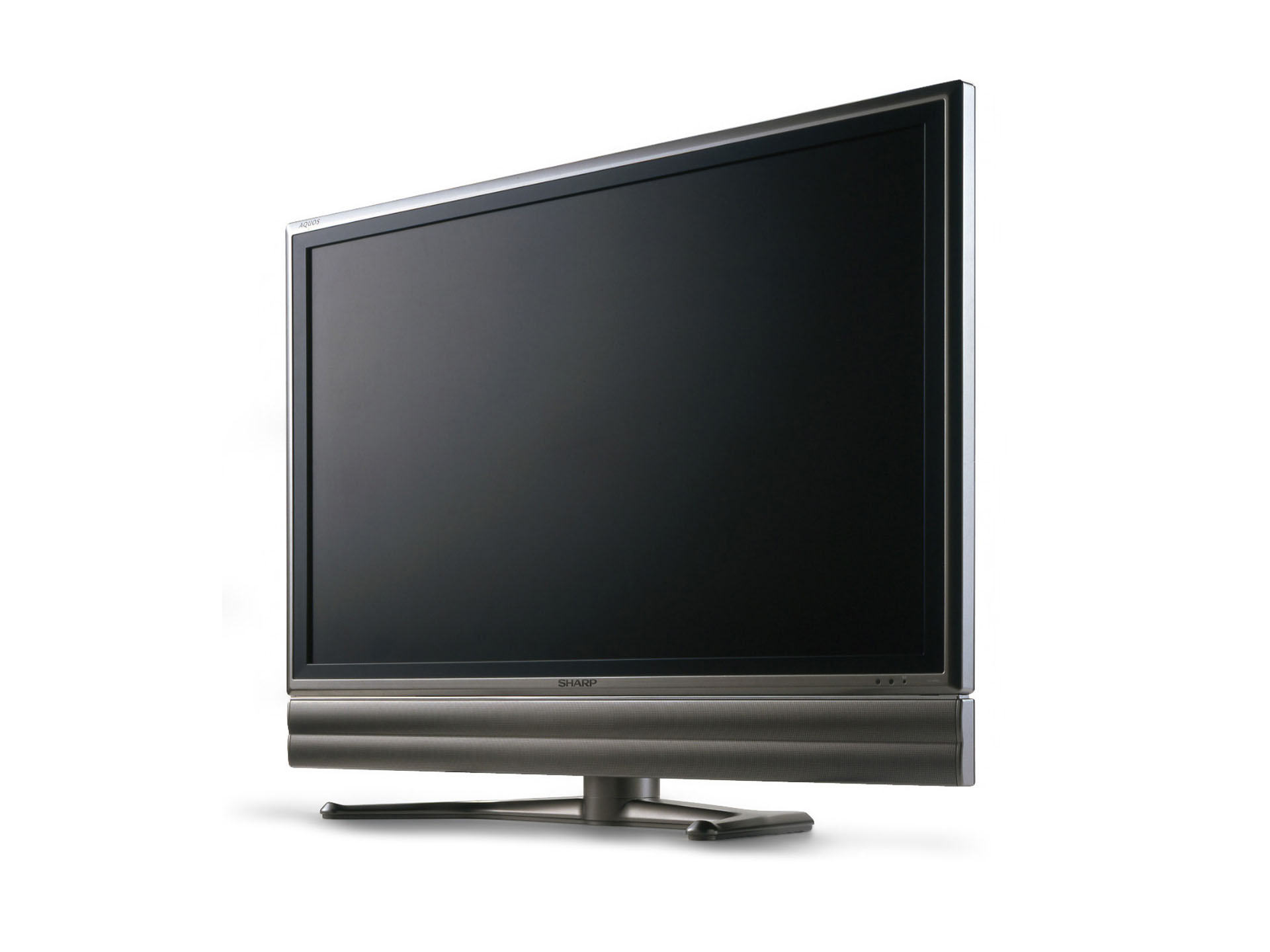
Aquos LC-37GD3 (2004) designed by Kita

After the first models, Sharp introduced later in 2001 the B1 series equipped with a PC Card and then the larger widescreen 30" high-definition LC-30BV3 model with a WXGA (1280x768, 15:9 ratio) resolution. Its North American equivalent LC-30HV2U was released in April 2002. In April 2003, the first 37" Aquos was introduced, further pushing LCD into living room sets capable of replacing bulky CRT. Sharp's SmartLink wireless technology was incorporated into the Aquos LC-15L1U-S.

=== Impact ===
Aquos TVs reached one million units sold within two years. The product line successfully disrupted Sony's primacy in the TV industry and made CRT look dated. By 2003, Sharp was facing new competition from Philips, Samsung, LG and Sony and their own competing LCD products. However, Sharp maintained its advantage in the fledging market thanks to its Kameyama manufacturing plant in Mie Prefecture and "vertical" integration model.

Accumulated shipments of Aquos series TVs had reached 5 million units as of December 2004 and 10 million units as of May 2006. Sharp Aquos made up every one-in-four LCD sets sold by 2005.

In an effort to fight back against Sharp, Sony and Samsung had created a multi-billion dollar joint venture in April 2004 called S-LCD Alliance to build and operate LCD production lines. LG and Philips also launched a joint venture in 2004. Q4 2005 marked the first quarter since the start of the LCD TV industry that Sharp was no longer the market leader thanks to successful competition. In 2006, Sony became the largest LCD TV maker after its launch of Bravia, whereas in the same year Samsung overtook Sony to become the largest TV maker overall.

== Later models ==
In August 2004, Sharp launched the very first 1920x1080 resolution digital tuner LCD TV and at 45" was also the largest sized LCD. In December 2006, it launched the first 32" (and hence smallest) LCD TV with 1080p resolution.

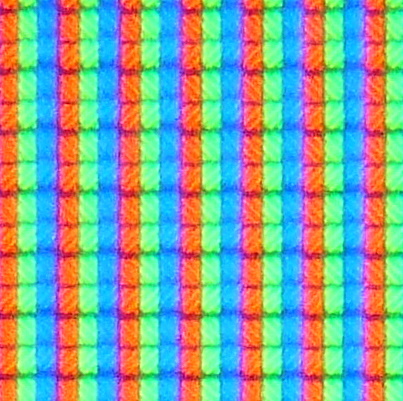
Close up of LCD pixels showing "white" (taken from Sharp Aquos LC-32BV8E in 2009)

In 2009, Sharp released the first series of LCD HDTVs to feature integrated Blu-ray Disc players with the BD-60U and BD-80U series. In mid 2009, Sharp presented the first Aquos LCD TVs with LED backlighting rather than CCFL (fluorescent lamp) with the LC-LE700UN series. It featured the proprietary X-Gen panel reducing light leakage for deep blacks with a 2,000,000:1 contrast ratio. As of 2009, some Aquos televisions run a Linux-based operating system.

Some Aquos LCD TVs are notable for displaying color in a RYGB color space known as Quattron, which adds a yellow component, as opposed to the standard RGB color space used by most color televisions. These were launched in 2010. They have been commercially successful although some have called it a gimmick.

The first Aquos televisions with a 3D stereoscopic display were introduced in September 2010, namely the AQUOS Quattron LE925 series.

At CES 2012, Sharp introduced the world's largest home TV, a 90-inch LED-backlit Aquos that could be hung on a wall and sold for $10,999. While other manufacturers (and Sharp itself) had also built TV sets even larger in the past, they were either prototype or concept models at trade shows, or were built for special commercial usage.

In June 2013, the first 4K Aquos TV was introduced as a 70-inch set which additionally was "THX-certified".

== Outsourced years ==
After facing severe financial deficits, Sharp divested its TV businesses through brand licensing agreements. Between 1 January 2015 and 22 February 2017, all Sharp and Sharp Aquos branded products sold in Europe were manufactured and distributed by Slovak company Universal Media Corporation (UMC) alongside an acquired plant in Toruń, Poland. Sharp's engineering role was relegated to only background design support. Under a deal struck in 2016 (by which time Sharp was under ownership of Foxconn), Sharp bought back control of TVs in the region by purchasing UMC's parent company.

A similar outsourcing and brand licensing also took place for Sharp's North American TV business: from 6 January 2016 to 8 May 2019, Sharp/Aquos-branded TVs sold in the United States were entirely designed and engineered by Chinese company Hisense. This was through a deal struck in 2015 which included a plant at Rosarito, Mexico. Sharp's new owner, Foxconn, attempted to reverse the outsourcing models in an attempt to prove Sharp's competitiveness and that it is not a dead brand. In 2017, Foxconn filed a lawsuit against Hisense concerning quality of TVs sold under its Sharp branding citing the TVs "violate FCC rules on electromagnetic interference emissions, and [...] Hisense gave consumers deceptive information about picture size, brightness levels and the 4K resolution." This lawsuit was dropped in early 2018. However in 2019, Sharp regained its licensing and brand, buying back its assets from Hisense.

In Japan itself, Sharp never outsourced its line of televisions including Aquos. In late 2017, Sharp symbolically announced the world's first commercial 8K UHD television (AQUOS LV-70X500E) fully engineered by Sharp itself and released in 2018.

== 2020s ==
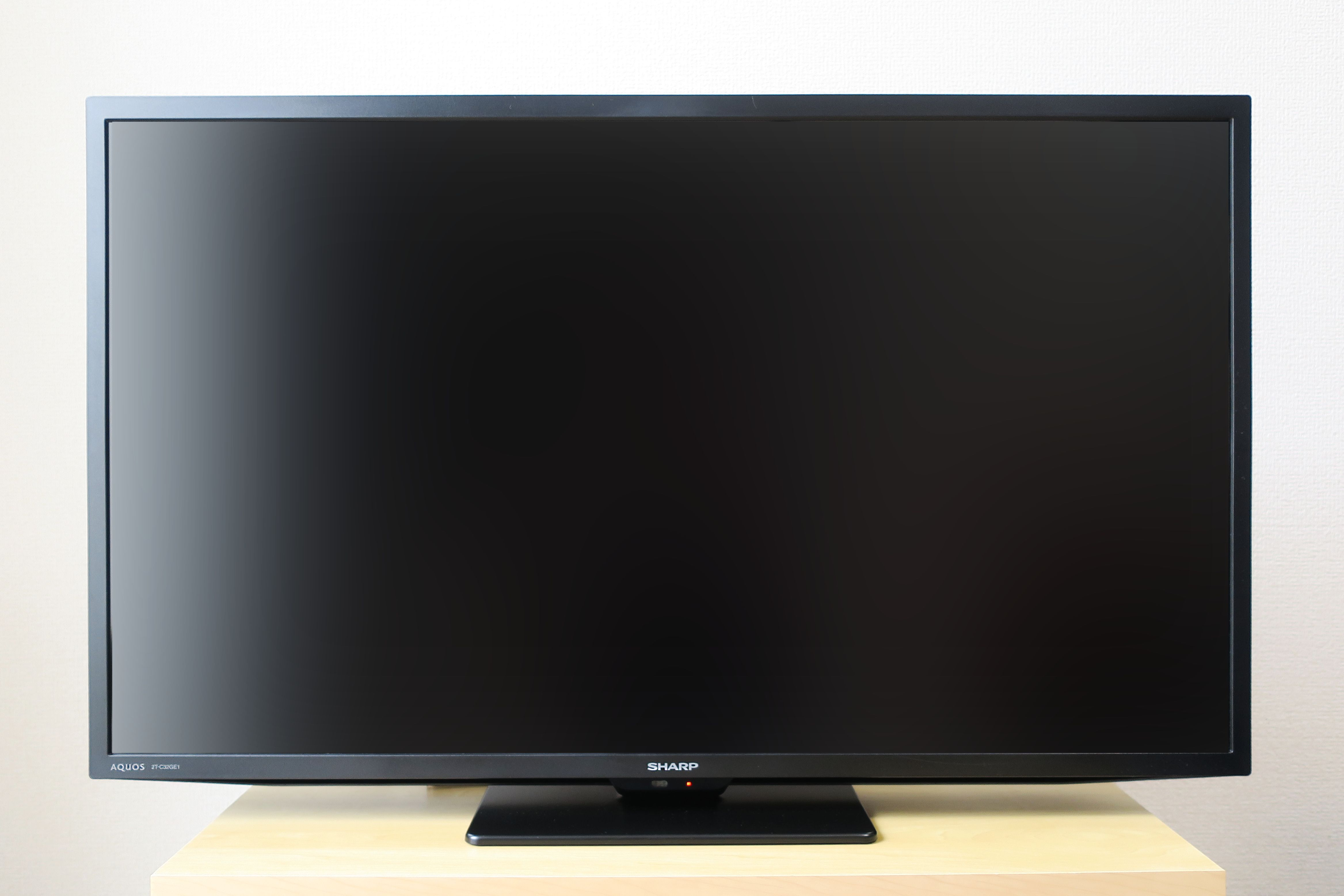
A non-smart Sharp Aquos model sold in Japan

Sharp designed a proprietary technology called XLED for its range of Mini LED TVs. They first launched in Japan in December 2021 and were then presented at CES 2023 for global availability.

== Non-television products ==
Especially in the Japanese domestic market, the AQUOS branding has been used for other lifestyle products such as mobile phones.

== See also ==
- Blue Man Group Sharp Aquos Theatre
- TFT LCD
- Liquid crystal display television
