= Pixelplus =

Digital filter image processing technology

Pixel Plus, is a proprietary digital filter image processing technology developed by Philips, who claims that it enhances the display of analogue broadcast signals on their TVs.

Pixel Plus interpolates the broadcast signal to increase the picture size by one third, from 625 lines to 833 lines. It also doubles the horizontal resolution, although each horizontal line is analogue.

Other features include motion interpolation, a processing technique that interpolates (or creates) video fields (or frames) by analyzing fields (or frames) before and after the insertion point. This process is primarily focused on film-based content which is filmed in either 24 fps or 25 fps. The motion interpolation function of Pixel Plus is an alternative to 3:2 pulldown processing, which is the standard process of converting film to video.

In 2005, Pixelplus 2 was launched. This version was the first to be able to perform motion reinterpolation on 480p and 576p material.

In 2006, Pixelplus 3 was launched. This version was the first to be able to perform motion reinterpolation on 720p and 1080i material, except for US products.

In 2007, Pixel Perfect HD Engine was launched. This version was the first to be able to perform motion reinterpolation on 1080p material, and introduced 720p and 1080i motion interpolation in US products.

Not to be confused with Pixelplus Co., Ltd. (Nasdaq: PXPL), a fabless semiconductor company in Korea that designs, develops, and markets CMOS image sensors for various consumer electronics applications.
