= Hard and soft light =

Types of lighting in photography and filmmaking

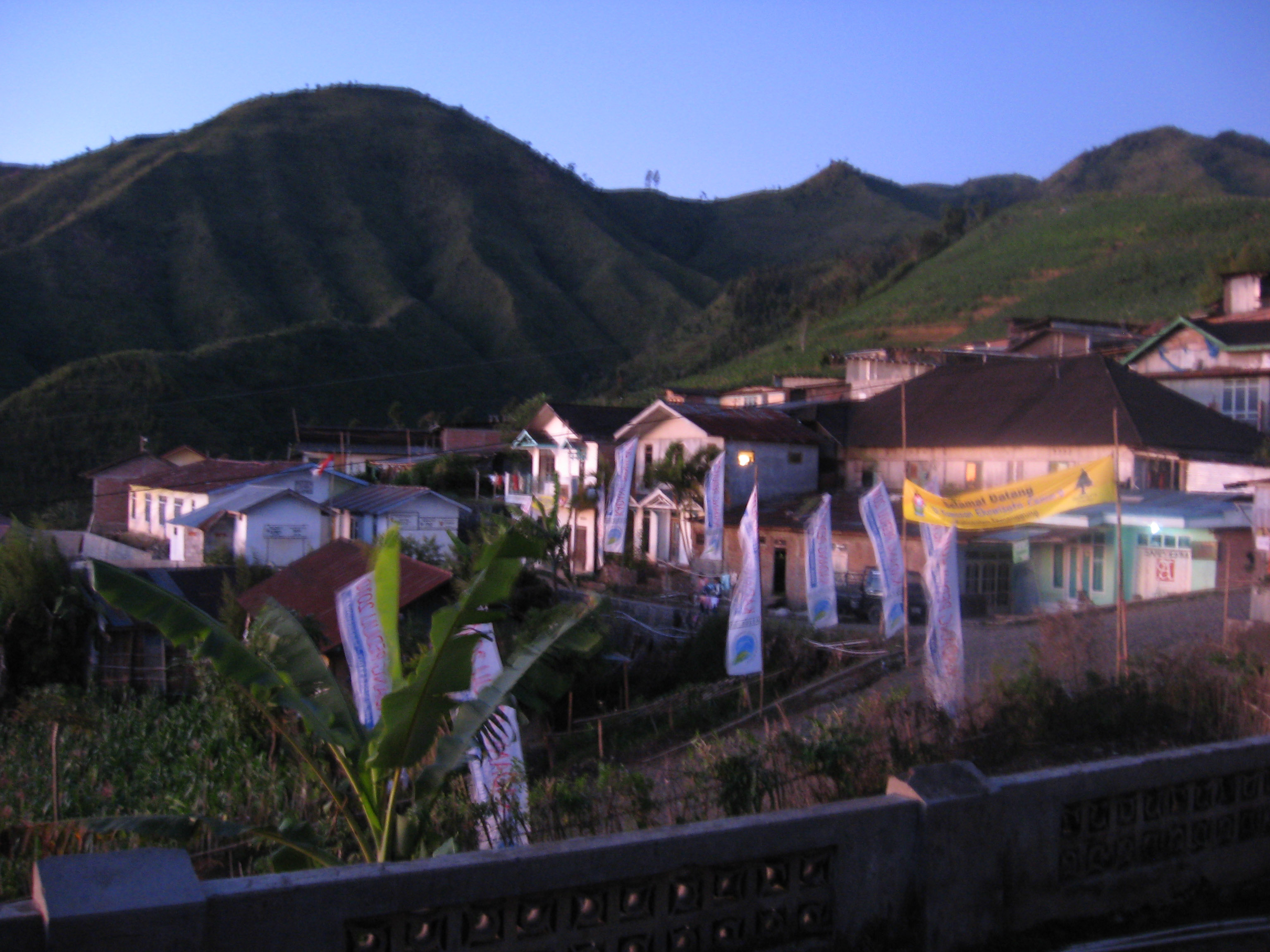
Natural soft lighting from a sunrise in Temanggung Regency, Central Java, Indonesia

Hard and soft light are different types of lighting that are commonly used in photography and filmmaking. Soft light is light that tends to "wrap" around objects, projecting diffused shadows with soft edges, whereas hard light is more focused and produces harsher shadows.

The hardness or softness of light depends mostly on three features of the source: the size of its surface, its distance from the object, and the thickness of its diffusion material. A large, distant light source with thick diffusion material will produce softer lighting than one that is smaller and closer to the subject, with thinner diffusion material.

== Soft light ==
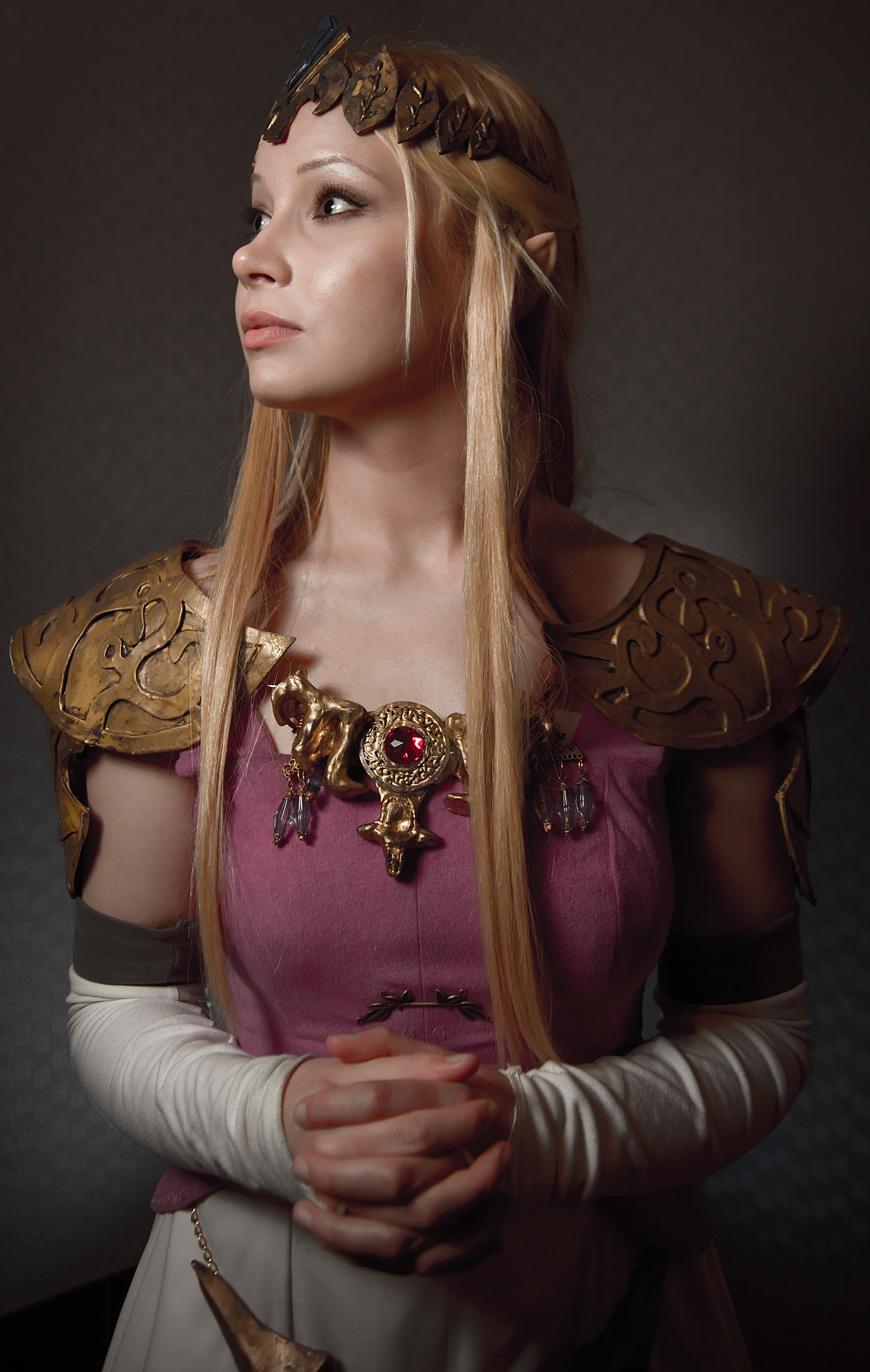
Artificial soft light from a beauty dish is used in this portrait of a cosplayer dressed as Princess Zelda.

Soft light tends to "wrap" around subjects, producing shadows with soft, fuzzy edges. Softness of light increases with the size of the light source, as the emitted light rays will travel in many directions as they move toward the subject. Light sources can also produce softer light by using diffusion material (like in a softbox) or by bouncing the light off a surface (like with a reflector).

Soft light use is popular in photography and cinematography. By diffusing hard shadows, softening dark areas, and removing sharp edges, soft light produces more flattering images of the human form. Colours may also appear richer and more realistic.

== Hard light ==
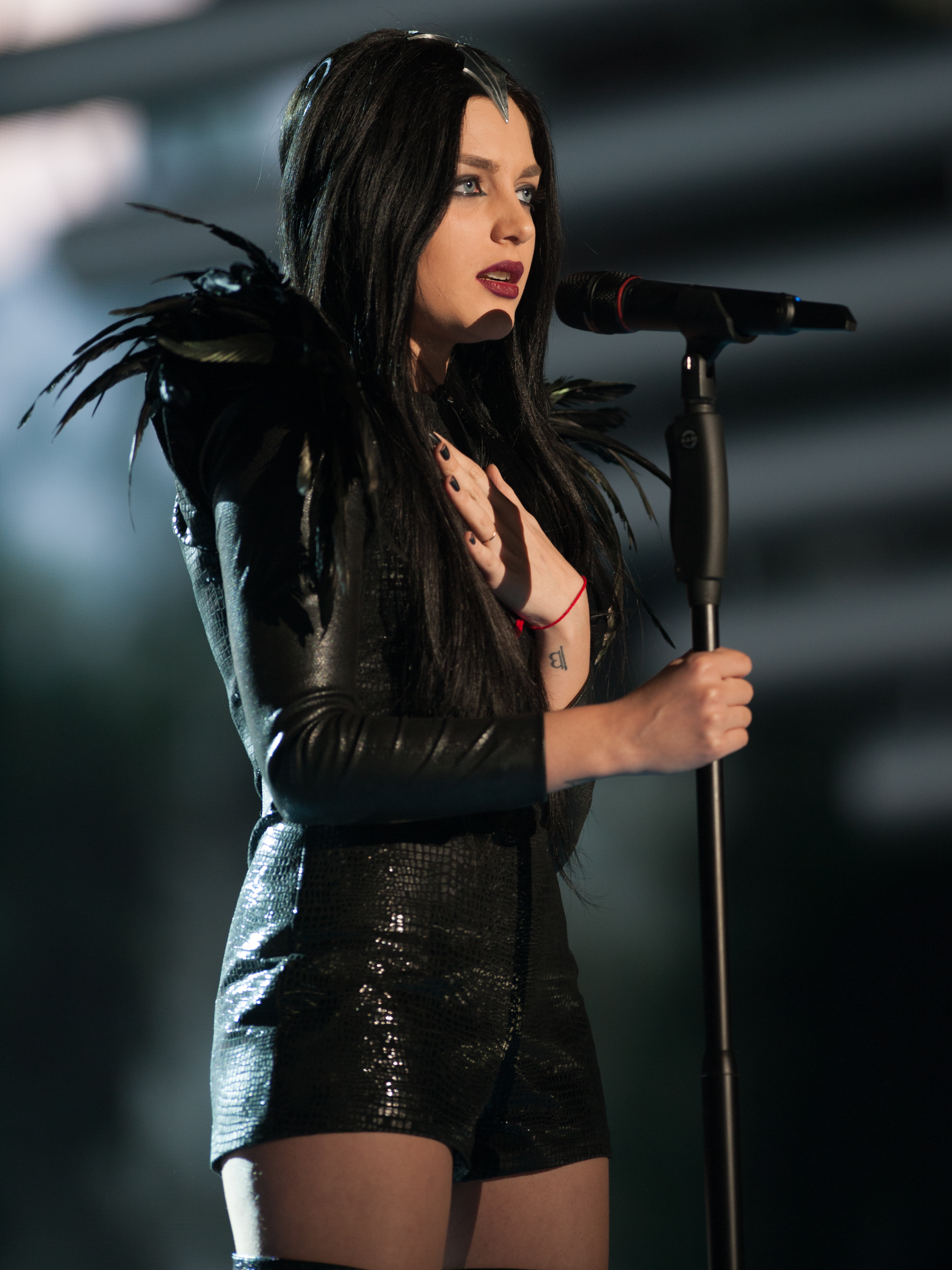
Hard light in a photograph of Nina Sublatti performing at the Eurovision Song Contest

Hard light comes from a single, usually bright, source, which is relatively small compared to the subject. Photographs taken in such lighting have high contrast and sharply defined shadows. The appearance of the shadow depends on the lighting instrument. For example, Fresnel lights can be focused such that their shadows can be "cut" with crisp shadows. That is, the shadows produced will have 'harder' edges with less transition between illumination and shadow. The focused light will produce harder-edged shadows. Focusing a Fresnel lens makes the rays of emitted light more parallel. The parallelism of these rays determines the quality of the shadows. For shadows with no transitional edge/gradient, a point light source is required. Hard light casts strong, well defined shadows.

When hitting a textured surface at an angle, hard light will accentuate the textures and details in an object. This will also increase the 3D-appearance of the object.

== Fall-off ==
Light intensity tends to dim with distance. For a point source of light, intensity decreases as distance increases. Intensity (I) is inversely proportional to the square of the distance (D), as expressed by the formula I = 1/D^{2}.

For a point light source, with a tiny area, intensity is inversely proportional to distance. A softer light source is larger in area and so does not drop in intensity as quickly as a point light source does.

Certain lensed lighting instruments (such as ellipsoidal reflector spotlights) have a good deal of "throw" and do not lose much intensity as distance increases. The nearly parallel rays of such instruments tends to cast hard shadows. These light sources tend to be more effective at long distances than soft light sources.

== Softness/hardness of various light sources ==
Most light sources have a non-negligible size and therefore exhibit the properties of a soft light to some degree. Even direct sunlight does not cast perfectly hard shadows.

In "hard" light sources, the parallelism of the rays is an important factor in determining shadow behaviour.

The quality of light can be altered by using diffusion gel or aiming a lighting instrument at diffusing material such as a silk. When shooting outdoors, cloud cover provides nature's version of a softbox.

== See also ==
- Ellipsoidal reflector spotlight
- Beauty dish
