= Jerry Avenaim =

American photographer

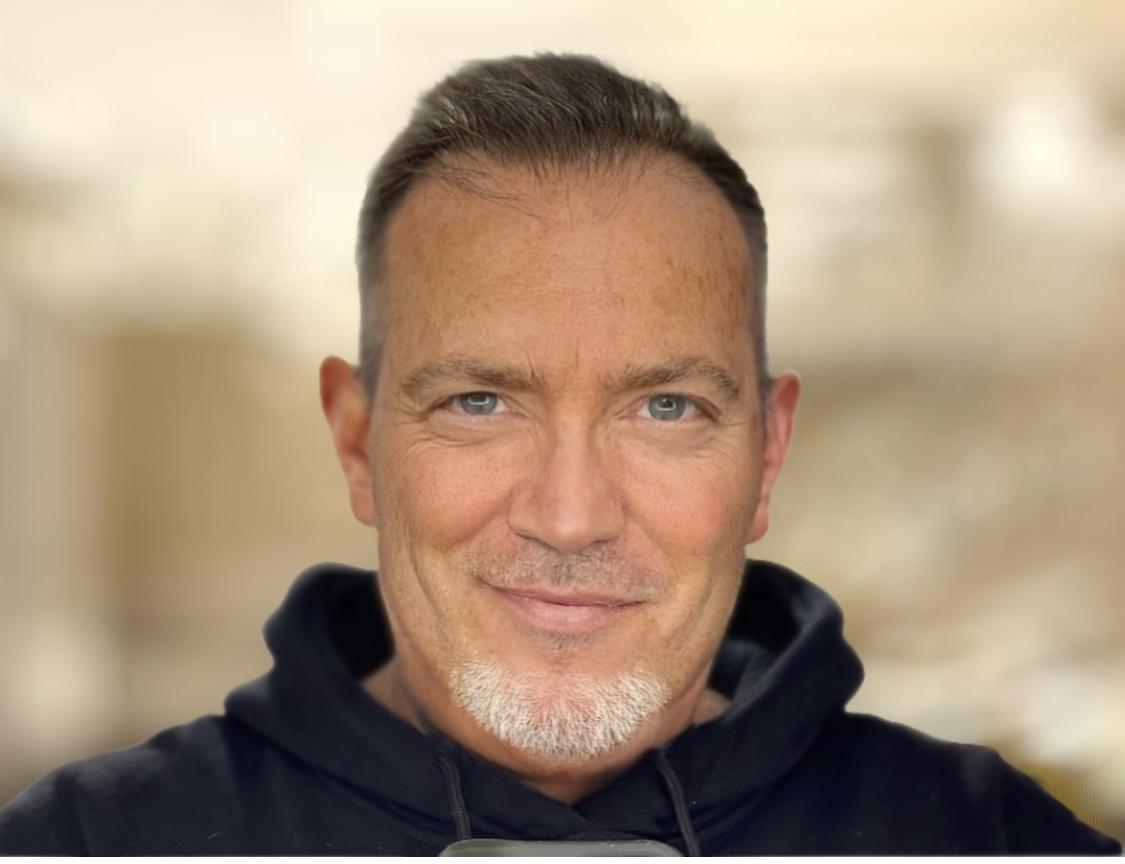
- Self-portrait (2021)
- Born: August 21, 1961 (age 65); Chicago, Illinois, U.S.
- Education: Northwestern University
- Known for: Fashion photography, celebrity photography
- Awards: Profoto Master of Light, 2010; Kodak Icon Award, 2005

Jerry Avenaim (born August 21, 1961) is an American photographer best known for his fashion and celebrity images.

== Early life ==
As a teenager, Avenaim got his first camera – an all-manual 35mm Exakta that his father had brought over from Paris. He was raised in Chicago.

== Career ==
=== Early work ===
At age 19, Avenaim started his career as assistant to photographer Patrick Demarchelier in New York. When he began to work independently in 1985 his first assignment was a foreign edition Vogue cover of supermodel Cindy Crawford. Later, he lived and worked out of Milan for Italian Vogue under the direction of editor-in-chief Franca Sozzani.

=== Commercial photography ===
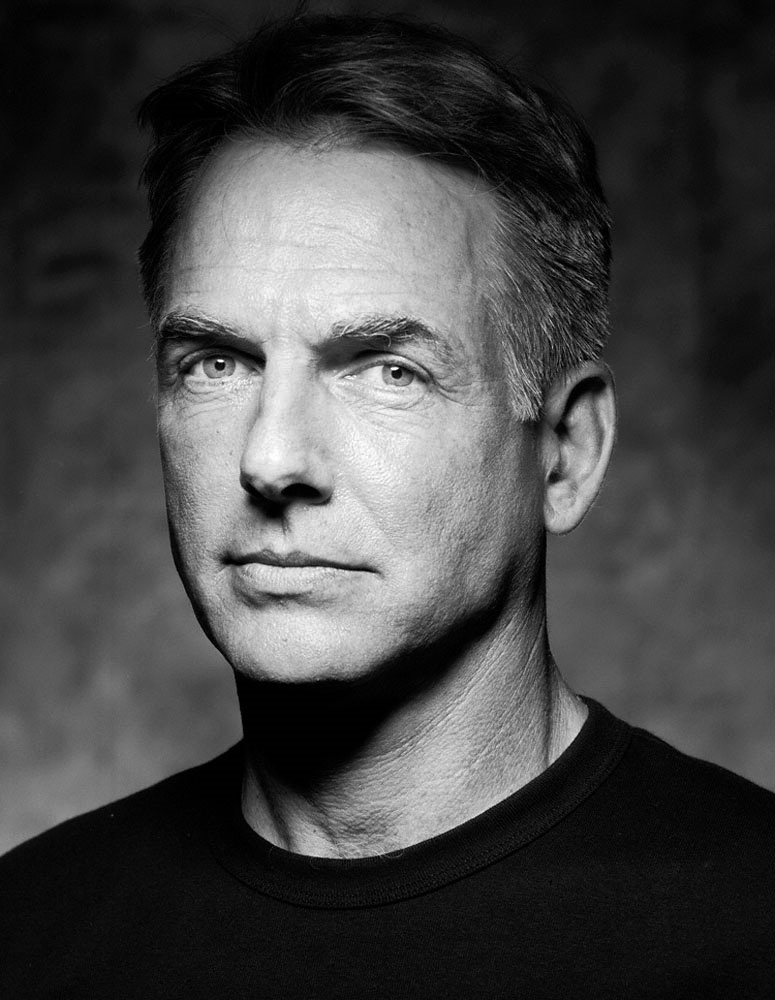
Photographed by Avenaim Mark Harmon, a Wikipedia Picture of the Day

Avenaim resides in Los Angeles, California, where he works primarily in portrait and commercial photography, with a focus on celebrity subjects. His work has been published in magazines such as Vogue, GQ, Vanity Fair, Newsweek, and Glamour, and appeared on the covers of publications including Vogue, Newsweek, People, TV Guide, and Detour.

His portrait subjects have included actors and public figures such as Halle Berry, Helen Hunt, Jeff Bridges, Mel Gibson, Phil McGraw, Angela Bassett, Patricia Arquette, Brooke Shields, and Julia Roberts. Avenaim's photo of Halle Berry appeared on the cover of the People magazine's Yearbook issue in January 2003, where it was recognized as Picture of the Year. The image was also nominated for a Pulitzer Prize for Photography.

In 2003, Avenaim produced a segment on "lighting techniques for photographing celebrities" for ZugaPhoto.TV and appeared in the instructional DVD How to Take Great Pictures which was released in 2004. During this period, Avenaim was working on a compilation book project of nude portraits titled Naked Truth. In 2004 and 2005, he led workshops and seminars at the PhotoImaging & Design Expo (PIDE) in San Diego, focusing on portrait photography and lighting techniques.

In 2005, advertising agency J. Walter Thompson commissioned Avenaim to photograph country singer Toby Keith for a campaign for Ford trucks and sport utility vehicles. His photograph of Donald Trump was used for the cover of the book Donald Trump: Master Apprentice, written in 2005 by Gwenda Blair. As of 2006, Naked Truth had not been published, and Avenaim was also working on another book project titled Luminosity: The Fine Art of Photographing Celebrities. His work and techniques have been cited in photography publications, including Rolando Gomez's Garage Glamour: Digital Nude and Beauty Photography Made Simple (2006).

Avenaim has received sponsorship from photography-related companies including Lexar Media (as an "Elite Photographer") and Mamiya cameras and Profoto lighting (as a "Master Photographer").

== Recognition and awards ==
- American Photographer New Faces 1988
- Kodak Icon Award 2005
- Canon_Inc. "Explorer of Light" 2007
- Profoto "Master of Light" Award 2010
