= Profoto =

1968 Stockholm company

- Native name: Profoto Aktiebolag
- Company type: Privately held company
- Industry: Photographic equipment
- Founded: 1968
- Founder: Conny Dufgran; Eckhard Heine
- Headquarters: 57 Landsvägen, Sundbyberg, Stockholm, Sweden
- Key people: Anders Hedebark (CEO); Conny Dufgran (Chairman)
- Website: www.profoto.com

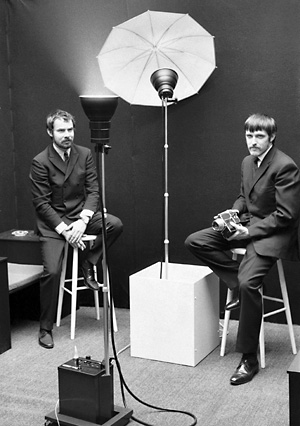
Founders Eckhard Heine and Conny Dufgran, Photokina 1968.

Profoto is a Swedish company that develops photographic flashes and other light shaping tools for professional photographers. It was founded in 1968 by Conny Dufgran and Eckhard Heine in Stockholm.

== History ==
Profoto AB was founded in Stockholm, 1968, by Conny Dufgran, photography equipment retailer, and Eckhard Heine, photographer and engineer. Several notable professionals have used different Profoto products during their careers, such as Annie Leibovitz, Herb Ritts, and David LaChapelle.

== Products ==
The product range is mainly focused on studio photography, and includes battery powered flash generators for situations where portability is needed. There are remote control units that can be attached to a digital camera's flash socket and take advantage of flash synchronization and automatic through-the-lens measuring functionalities.

Profoto also sells speed rings, softboxes, rasters, and other tools that shape the light cone. The battery powered AirTTL flash units B1 and B2 have been noted for their robustness and portability. At Photokina 2016 in Germany, Profoto launched AirTTL studio flashes D2 and Pro-10, as well as the Air Remote TTL-S which was made in collaboration with Sony.

== See also ==
- Flash comparison
