= Speed ring =

Disk used to attach a soft box to a studio or continuous light source

A speed ring is a solid metal ring-shaped disk which is used to attach a soft box to a studio (strobe) or continuous (hotlight) light source.

There are 4 to 8 holes drilled into the circumference of the ring which receives the metal rods of the soft box; they are held in place by tension. Shapes can vary depending on the manufacturer. Typically, the opening in the center ranges from 4 to 7 inches, allowing the light source to enter the softbox or other modifier. Common ring types are Bowens, Profoto, and Alien Bees.
