= Rolando Gomez =

American photographer (born 1962)

Rolando Gómez
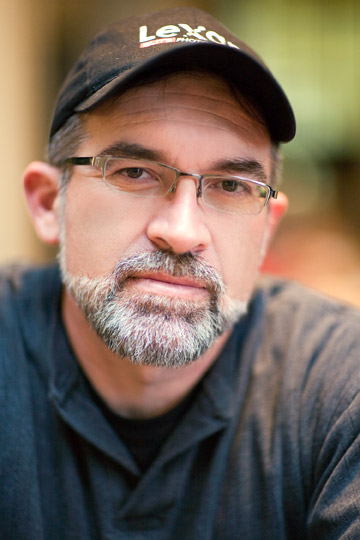
- Born: 1962 (age 63–64)
- Education: University of Texas at San Antonio, St. Philip's College
- Occupations: screenwriter, film producer, photojournalist, photographer, author
- Website: www.rolandogomez.com

Rolando Gómez is an American film producer, screenwriter, freelance photographer, author and an alumnus of the 2021 National Hispanic Media Coalition Series Scriptwriters Program and the Writers Guild Foundation Veterans Project. In 2021 he was an on-set associate producer for the feature films, I Am Gitmo and Everything Will Be Fine in the End. and Quora honored him in 2016, 2017 and 2018 as a Top Writer.

== Life and career ==
One of the original Lexar Media Elite Photographers, after Gómez left the active-duty U.S. Army as a staff sergeant, he joined the U.S. Air Force as a civilian and served as the Chief, Multimedia Production for the Air Force News Agency (AFNEWS), now the Air Force Public Affairs Agency (AFPAA). There he served for nine years and oversaw print, radio, and television streaming content for the Air Force official website plus other internal and external media publication and broadcast products.

One product, AFLINK (Air Force Link), increased its download video and radio streams from 180,000 to almost 700,000 monthly in the first year under Gómez' supervision and was touted in an article by Tech Republic. In 2004, the agency honored Gómez as the AFNEWS Senior Level Civilian Employee of the Year, worldwide.

Gómez served almost nine years active-duty as a military combat photographer in the US Army, and worked directly for the CINC United States Southern Command (USSOUTHCOM), Gen. George A. Joulwan, who created Operation Support Justice, in Germany at V Corps and at USSOUTHCOM headquarters in Panama for a total of four years.

The Dept. of Defense honored Gómez as one of the "Top Five" military combat photographers worldwide, plus awarded him the Defense Meritorious Service Medal for his actions on the war on drugs in Latin America during the Pablo Escobar era where Gómez' military unit tracked Escobar, other narcos, and the Shining Path guerrillas of Peru for 26-months as part of Operation Support Justice.

Gómez also deployed on assignments for the fall of the Berlin Wall, the Olympics, Presidential Inauguration, Desert Storm, Operation Uphold Democracy in Haiti, Operation Northern Watch in Turkey and the Rwandan genocide and refugee crisis in Africa plus many more world events.

His work has appeared in PARADE (cover story), NEWSWEEK, Rangefinder, D-Pixx, Peterson's 4-Wheel Drive, Stars and Stripes, Army Times, Airman, Soldiers, Playboy, Netscape, Studio Photography & Design, PMA Daily, and Leica World News plus other publications.

Gómez earned a Bachelor of Arts Degree in Communication, Electronic Media, summa cum laude (4.0 GPA), from the University of Texas at San Antonio (UTSA) in 2001 and an associate degree in Business Administration from St. Philips College, San Antonio. Gomez is also a State of Texas mediator in conflict resolution. He is listed by the University of Texas, San Antonio as a “notable graduate.”

== Bibliography ==
- Rolando Gómez (2015). Taming The Trouser Snake: A Man's Guide to Relationships, Romance, Sex and More. Charleston, SC: CreateSpace Independent Publishing Platform. p. 254. ISBN 978-1-51238-319-5.
- Rolando Gómez (2013). Socially Smart: Twitter Plus Facebook, Marketing Multipliers And Brand Boosters. Pennsauken, NJ: Bookbaby. ISBN 978-1-62675-475-1.
- Rolando Gomez (2006). Garage Glamour : Digital Nude and Beauty Photography Made Simple. Amherst, NY: Amherst Media. ISBN 1-58428-183-9.
- Rolando Gómez (2007). Rolando Gomez's Glamour Photography: Professional Techniques and Images. Buffalo, NY: Amherst Media, Inc. ISBN 978-1-58428-210-5.
- Rolando Gómez (2008). Rolando Gomez's Posing Techniques for Glamour Photography. Buffalo, NY: Amherst Media, Inc. ISBN 978-1-58428-238-9.
- Rolando Gómez (2010). Rolando Gomez's Lighting for Glamour Photography: Techniques for Digital Photographers. Buffalo, NY: Amherst Media, Inc. ISBN 978-1-58428-999-9.
- Jack Watson, Rolando Gómez (foreword) (2009). BEYOND THE GLAMOUR PHOTOGRAPH: How to Get Started and Be Successful as a Boudoir, Glamour, and Swimsuit Photographer: With Companion DVD. FL: Atlantic Publishing Company. ISBN 978-1-60138-391-4.
