= Elinchrom =

Swiss photography equipment company

Elinchrom LTD
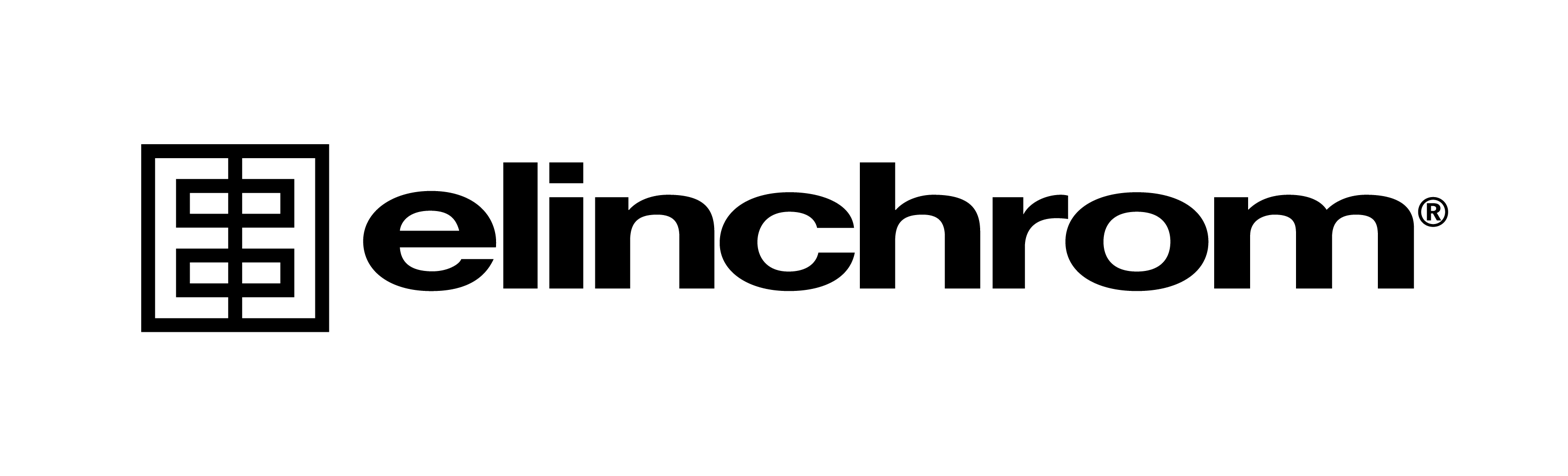
- Industry: Digital Imaging
- Founded: Renens, Switzerland (1962)
- Headquarters: Bussigny, Switzerland
- Area served: Worldwide
- Products: Studio Lighting Systems
- Website: https://www.elinchrom.com/

Elinchrom LTD is a Swiss company manufacturing flash equipment and light shaping tools for professional photographers. The company was founded in 1962 in Renens, Switzerland. In 2025, Elinchrom head office and logistics centre are transferred to Bussigny, Switzerland.

== Range ==
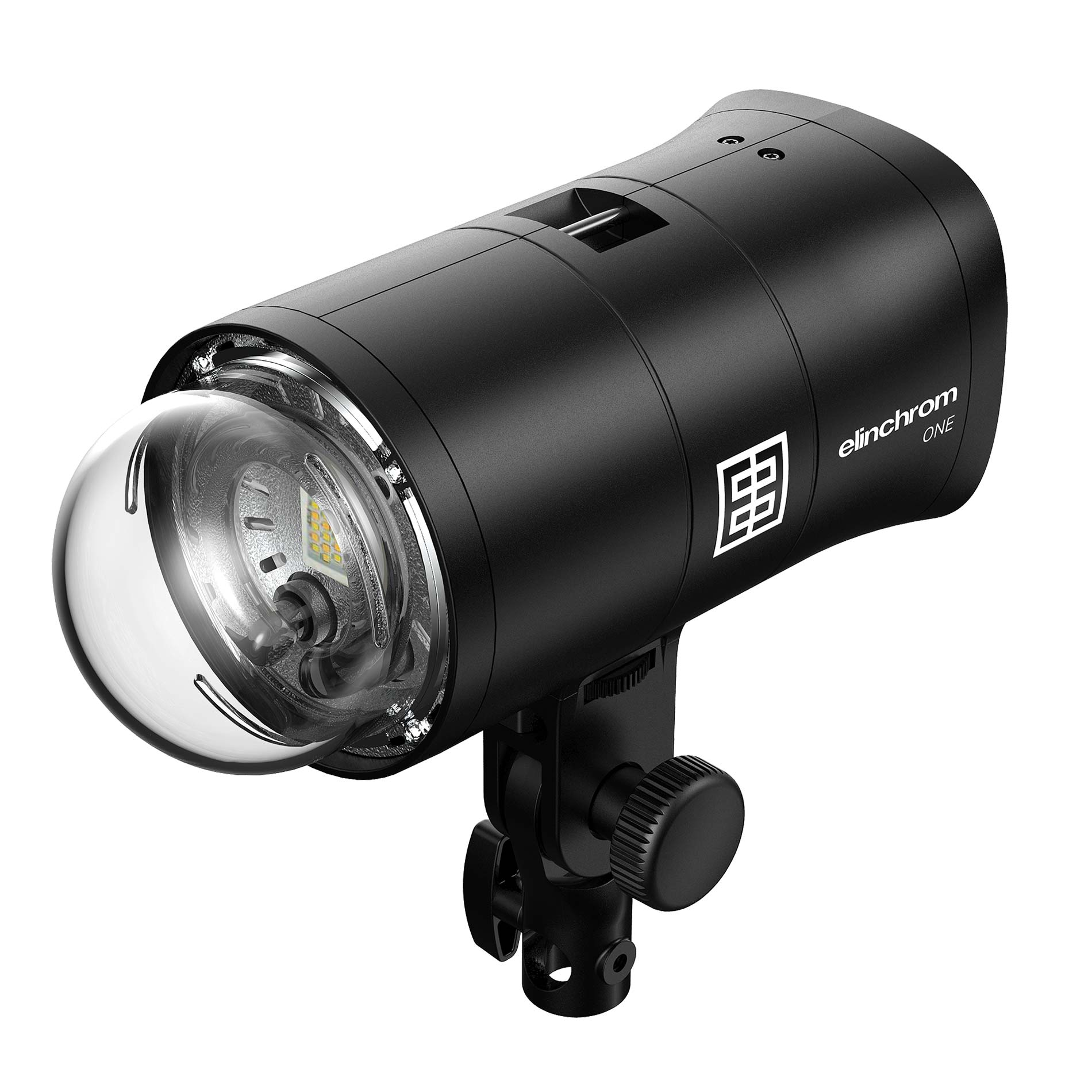
Elinchrom ONE

Elinchrom produces monolight flash heads, battery monolight, off-camera flash, continuous light, remotes, light shapers and other accessories.

=== Monolight flash heads ===
Recently, Elinchrom moved their tooling for the Compact entry-level lights to India where they are now producing the D-Lite RX series. The professional compact series, the ELC Pro HD is manufactured in Switzerland.

- D-Lite RX, ELC, ELC Pro HD

=== Battery monolight ===
Similar as monolight products with a removable battery for outdoor shootings.

- Elinchrom FIVE

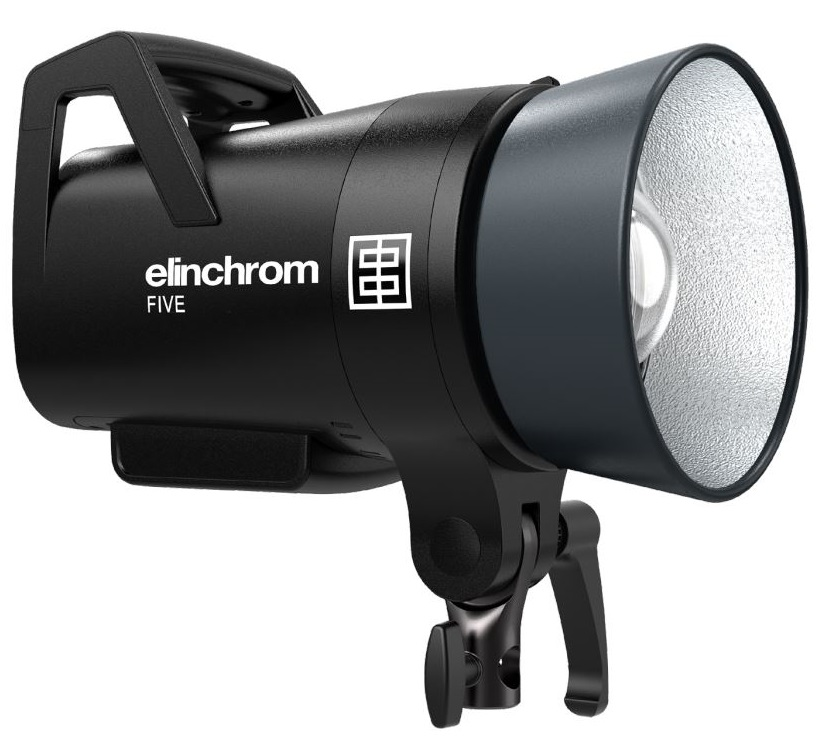
Elinchrom FIVE

=== Off-Camera flash ===
Built-in battery flash units and portable with all integrated features HSS, TTL and Action mode

- Elinchrom ONE, Elinchrom THREE, ELB 500 TTL

=== Continuous light ===
The continuous light uses bi-color LED with a colour temperature range of 2700K to 6500K and fully adjustable RGB in 1° increments. All units accept the same range of light modifiers as the flash units.

- Elinchrom LED 100 C

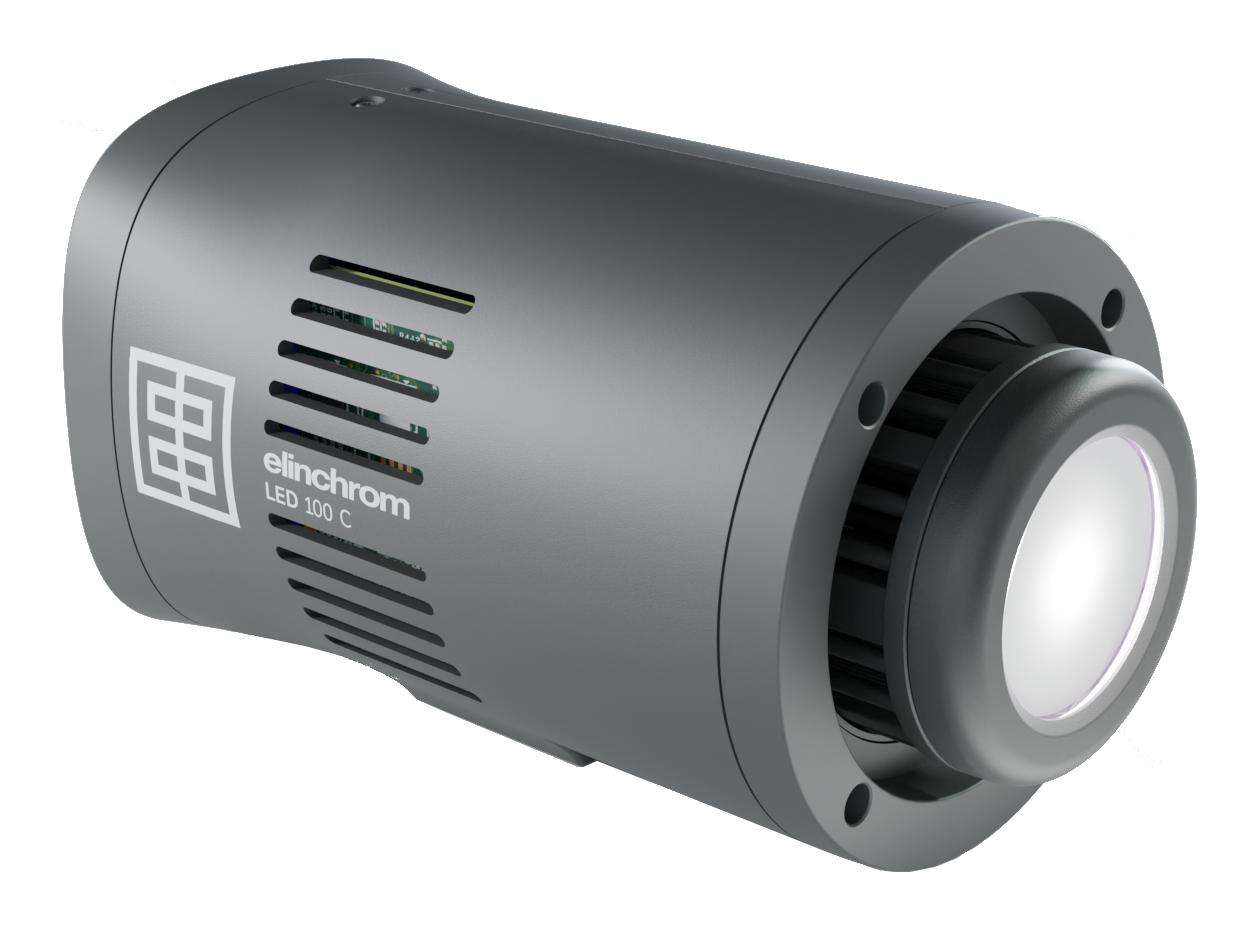
Elinchrom LED 100 C

=== Remote controllers ===
Remote controllers include:

- EL Skyport Wireless

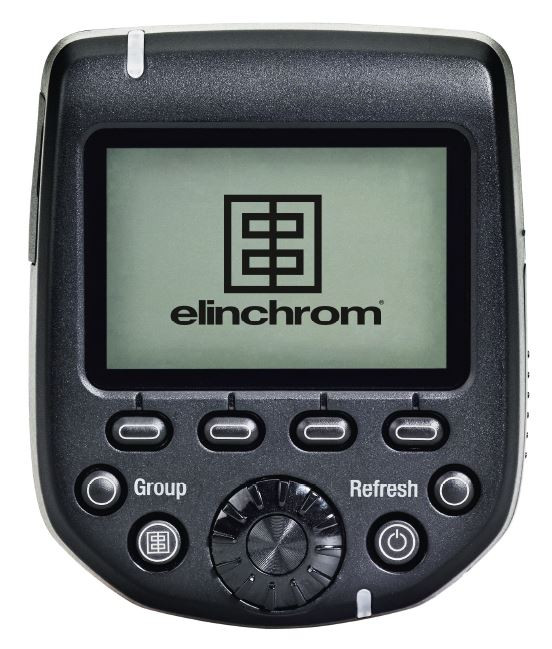
Elinchrom Skyport PRO

=== Light shapers ===
Elinchrom supplies a range of light shapers as accessories for their lights. Some accessories (such as umbrellas) attach to the light unit by means of a pole passing through a 7 mm hole through the head, and others (such as softboxes, reflector dishes and snoots) attach using Elinchrom's bayonet system.
