= Reflector (photography) =

Surface for directing light onto a subject

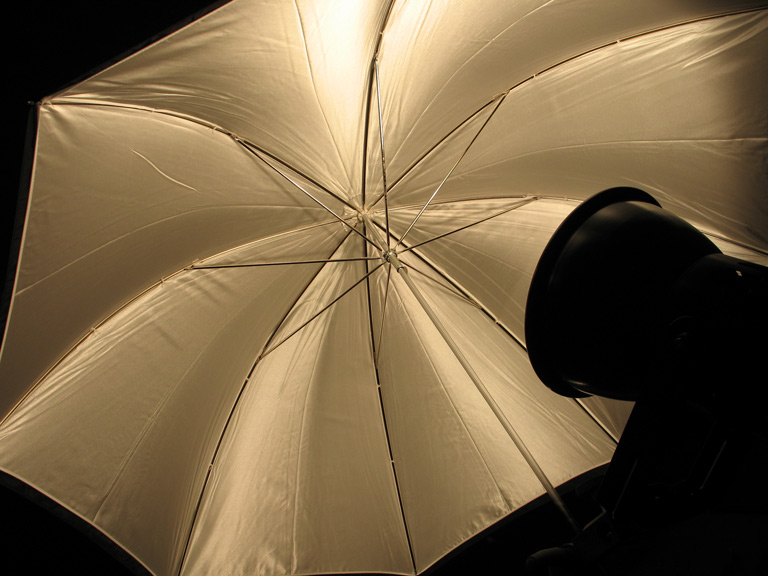
A traditional umbrella-style reflector, used to diffuse light from a photographic lamp to which it is normally attached.

In photography and cinematography, a reflector is an improvised or specialised reflective surface used to redirect light towards a given subject or scene.

== Types ==
Apart from certain highly specialized components found in enlargers, projectors and scanners, photographic reflectors fall into two main groups:

=== Lamp reflectors ===
Diagram of a lamp reflector, showing path that light typically takes from a light source.

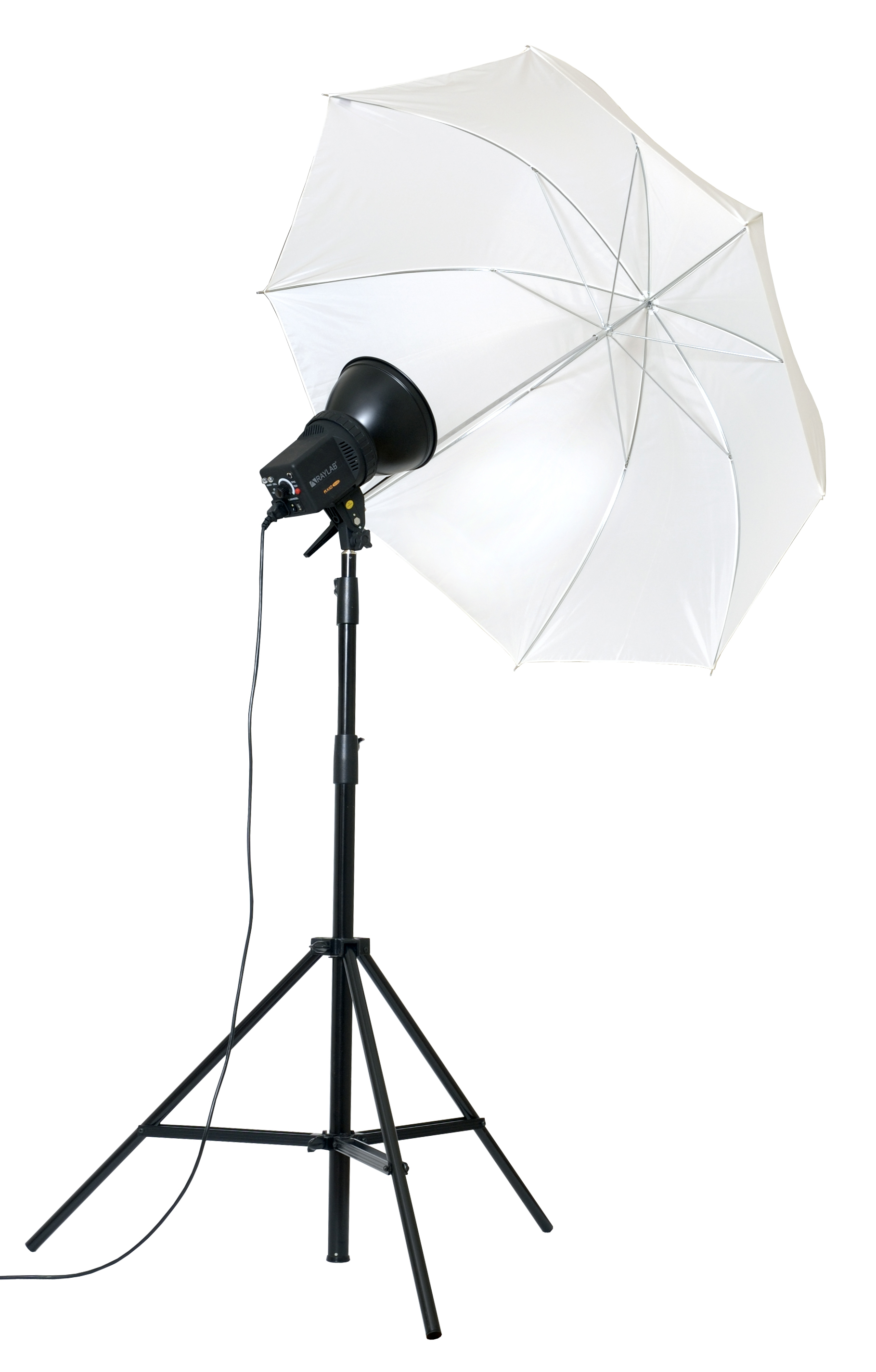
Umbrella - studio flash.

Similar to a domestic lampshade, these reflectors are attached to an artificial light source (for example, a filament bulb or flash tube) to shape and direct otherwise scattered light. They reflect light off their concave inner surfaces and direct it towards the subject to be photographed. Although there are a large number of variants, the most common types are:

- spherical, short-sided, giving a relatively broad spread of light;
- parabolic, providing a tighter, parallel beam of light.

The reflector factor is the ratio of the illumination provided by a lamp fitted within a reflector to the illumination provided without any reflector fitted. A matte reflector will typically have a reflector factor of around 2, due to its more diffuse effect, while a polished or metallic-finished reflector may have a factor of up to 6.

=== Board reflectors ===
Also known as plane reflectors, "flats" or bounce boards, this kind of reflector is located independent of a light source; the light is reflected off its surface, either to achieve a broader light source, or control shadows and highlights, or both. This kind of reflector generally has a very low reflectivity factor that varies widely according to surface texture and colour. As a result, it is most commonly used to control contrast in both artificial and natural lighting, in place of a fill light or "kick" light. In this case, light "spilling" from the main ambient or key light illuminating a scene is reflected back into the scene with a varying degrees of precision and intensity, according to the chosen reflective surface and its position relative to the scene.

Reflectors may also be used as a means of increasing the size of the main light source, which may (or may not) retain a direct path to the scene. By positioning a board reflector close to a light source, its effective size can be increased by "bouncing" the light off it. A very common example of this technique is the umbrella reflector, typically having a gold, silver or matte white interior onto which a lamp fitted with a circular reflector is projected, providing a broad, soft illumination. The lamp faces away from the scene to be photographed, allowing only reflected light to be thrown forward. In 1973 Raymond George Larson applied for a patent, granted in 1975, on a collapsible photographic reflector whose fabric surface is held by grommets on radiating ribs and can be reversed to present either of two different reflective sides.

== Techniques with board reflectors ==
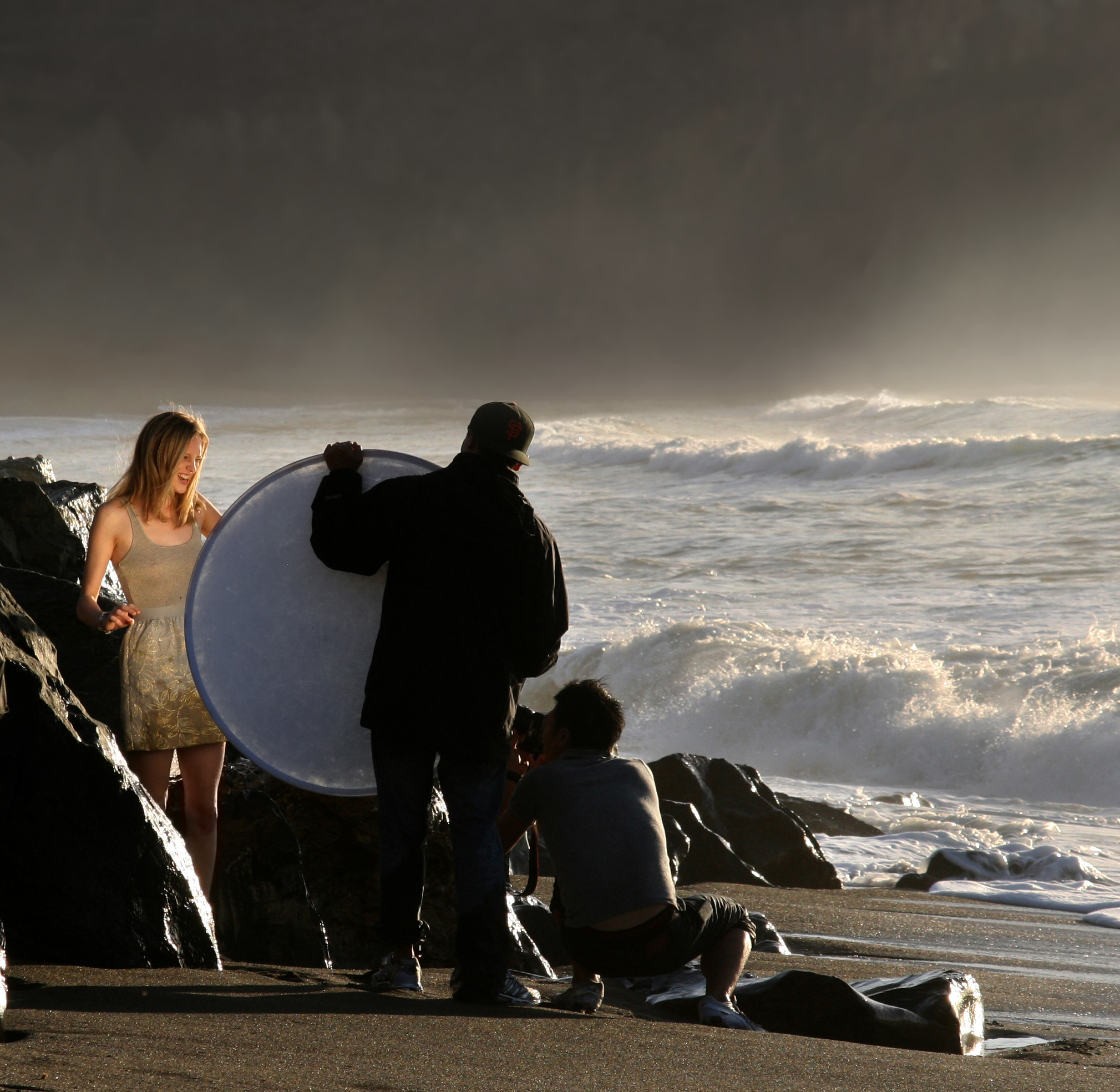
A portable folding reflector positioned to "bounce" sunlight onto a model

Reflectors vary enormously in size, colour, reflectivity and portability. In tabletop still life photography, small mirrors and card stock are used extensively, both to reduce lighting contrast and create highlights on reflective subjects such as glassware and jewelry. Larger-scale subjects such as motor vehicles require the use of huge "flats", often requiring specialised motorized winches to position them accurately.
Location photography calls for much more portable materials and a large range of lightweight, folding reflectors are commercially available in a variety of colors.

=== Bounce lighting ===
Photographers make regular use of walls, ceilings and even entire rooms as reflectors, especially with the interior of buildings which may lack sufficient available light. Often known as "bounce flash" photography, but equally common with Tungsten lights in cinematography. Used extensively throughout film history, in 1956 Subrata Mitra further pioneered the technique with the use of large scale diffusers to match studio lighting with location shooting.

The area to be photographed is lit by walls off-camera, which then provide illumination similar to that of a large window. When "bounced" off a ceiling, the lighting resembles that of fluorescent tubes. As this very broad, flat lighting is more typical of an overcast day outdoors, a more realistic interior illumination is achieved by reducing the power of additional lighting relative to the available light, so that either source may act as a fill to the other. Hence bounce lighting may provide either the primary or secondary (fill) light source, depending on its intensity.

=== Outdoor techniques ===
Walls also make ideal reflectors outdoors, reflecting sunlight back upon a subject and reducing shadows (and hence overall contrast) according to the color, size and proximity of the wall. A more readily available alternative is the portable, lightweight, collapsible reflector, commercially available in a range of sizes and colors, or improvised using a sheet of card stock or even a bed sheet. Stands may be erected to retain these reflectors, although it is often much more convenient and practical to have an assistant hold and move them.

== See also ==
- Beauty dish
- Flash
- Lighting
- Softbox
- Striplight
