= Beauty dish =

Photographic lighting device

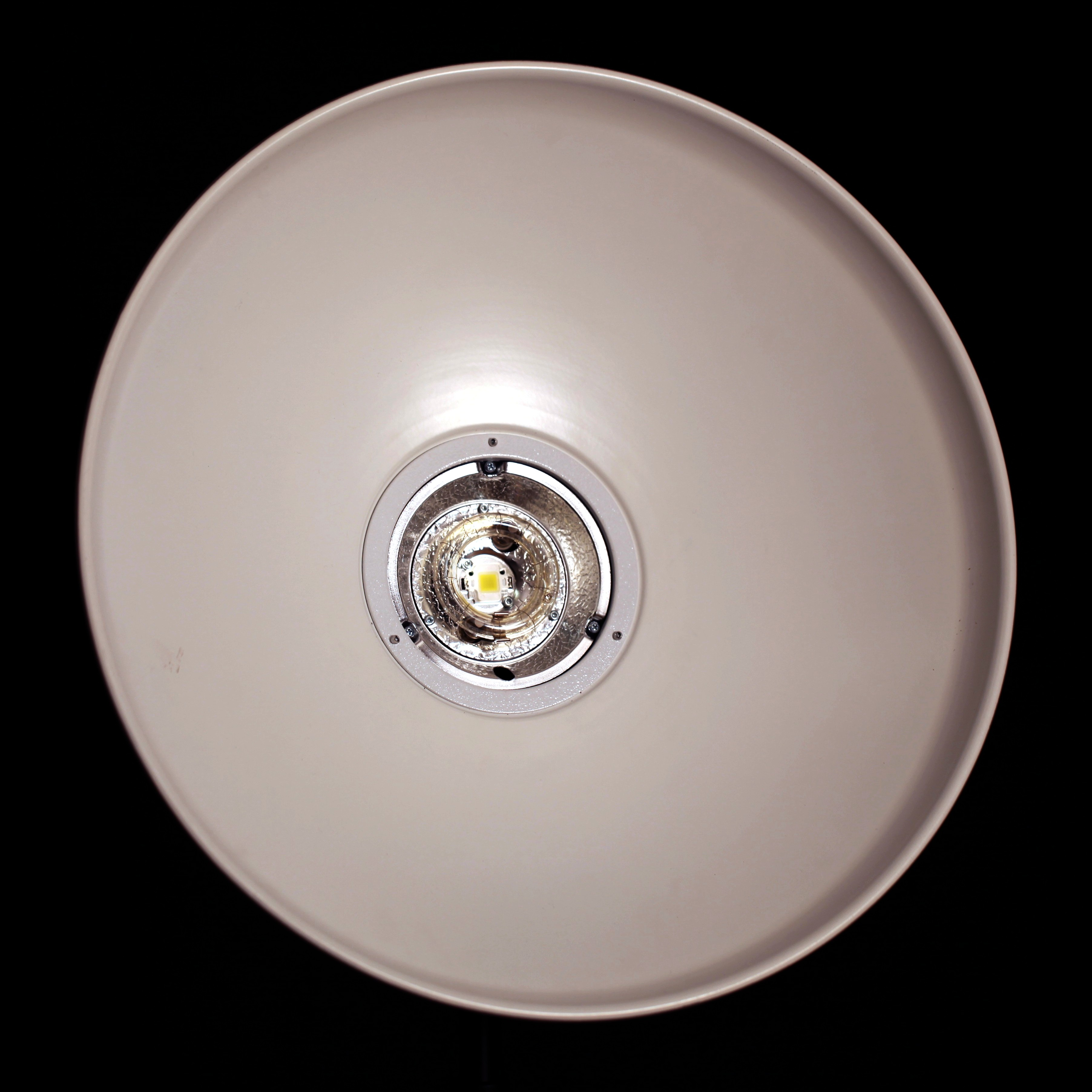
An Elinchrom beauty dish, white, 44 cm

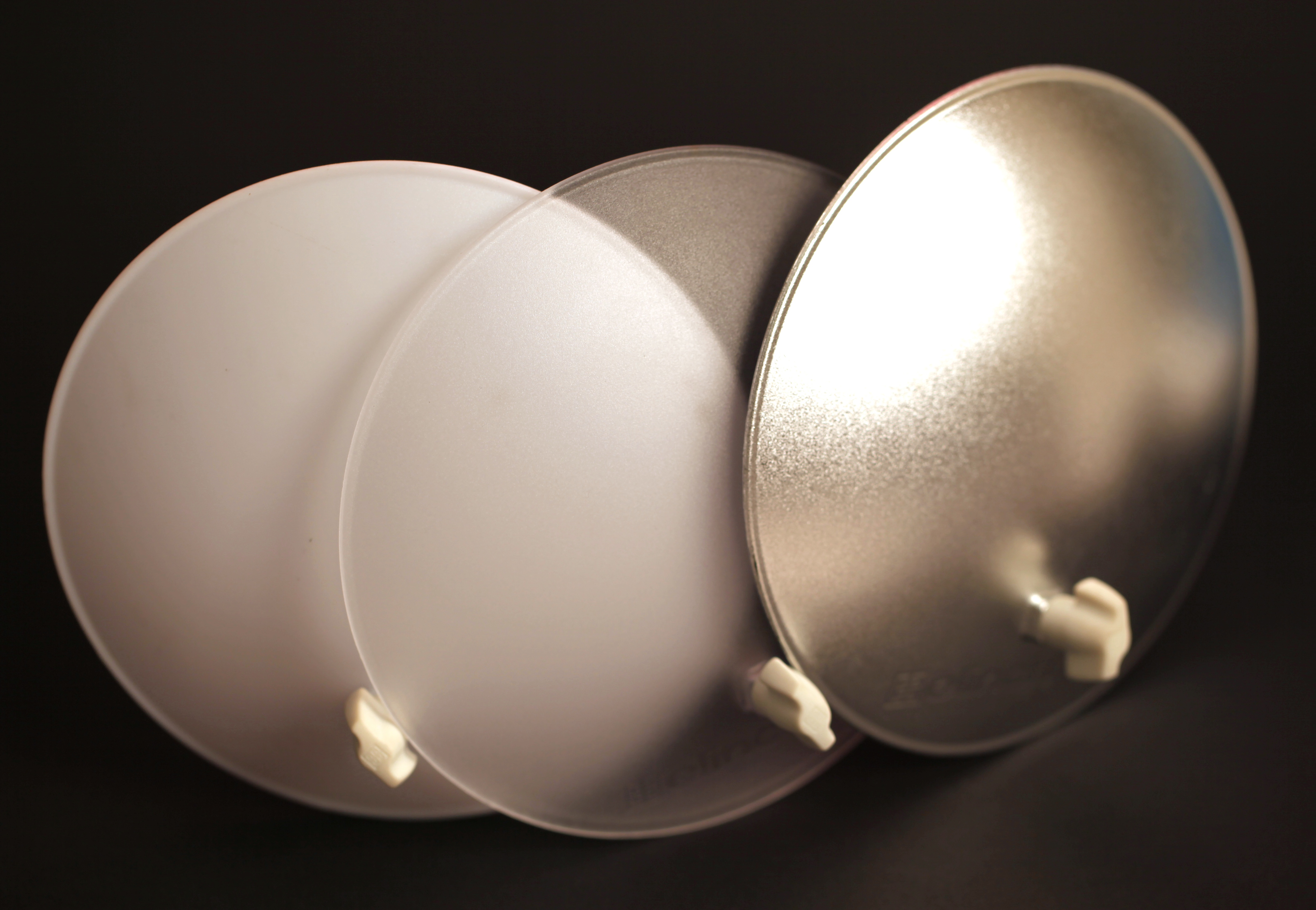
Reflectors in white, clear, and silver

A beauty dish is a photographic lighting device that uses a parabolic reflector to distribute light towards a focal point. Its light is softer than that of a direct flash but more directional and contrasty than that of a softbox.

== Uses ==
A beauty dish provides a relatively focused source of light. It is commonly used in portrait and fashion photography, where the way its light wraps around the subject while retaining some contrast is used to emphasize facial contours.

The shadows it creates can be used to model, or "sculpt", the face.

Beauty dishes are also used in sports photography, where their light can accentuate muscle definition and texture.

== Different models and uses ==
Beauty dishes are made in various sizes and finishes by many lighting manufacturers, including:

- Balcar/Alien Bees
- Bowens
- Broncolor Pulso
- Elinchrom
- Flashpoint
- Photogenic

Common lighting setups with a beauty dish include:

- One light: the dish is placed about two to four feet (0.6–1.2 m) from the subject's forehead, so that it produces catchlights in the eyes; a reflector below bounces light back into the shadows under the chin, and black cards at the sides keep the light on the face and shoulders.
- Two lights: a second light takes the place of the reflector below the face, giving more control over the fill.
- With a diffusion sock: a fabric cover over the dish softens the light and reduces the rendering of skin texture.
- With a grid: a grid narrows the beam into a spotlight-like pattern on the face, which has to be aimed carefully to avoid unwanted shadows.
