= Softbox =

Photographic lighting device

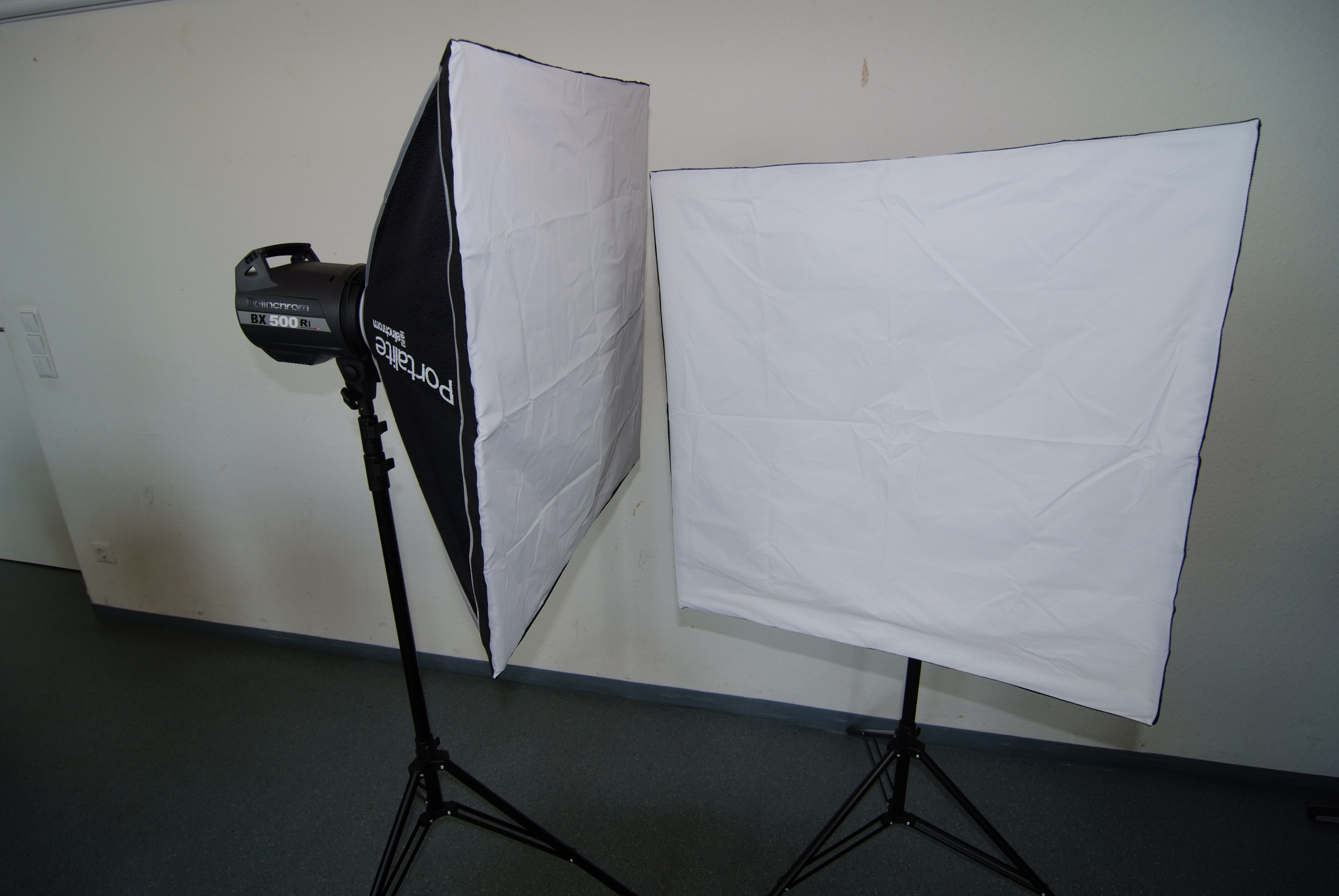
Two softboxes

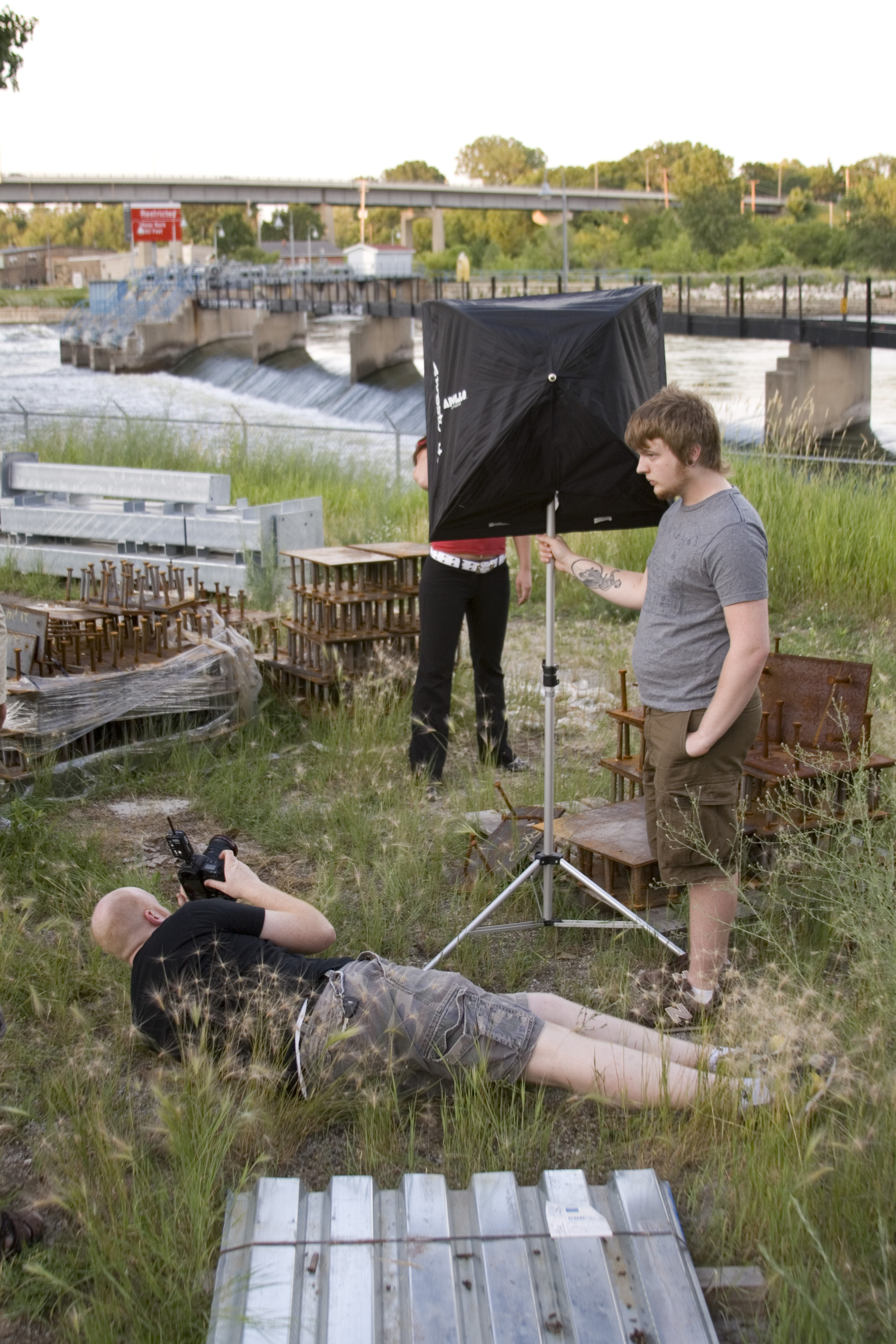
Outdoor portrait photography with a softbox

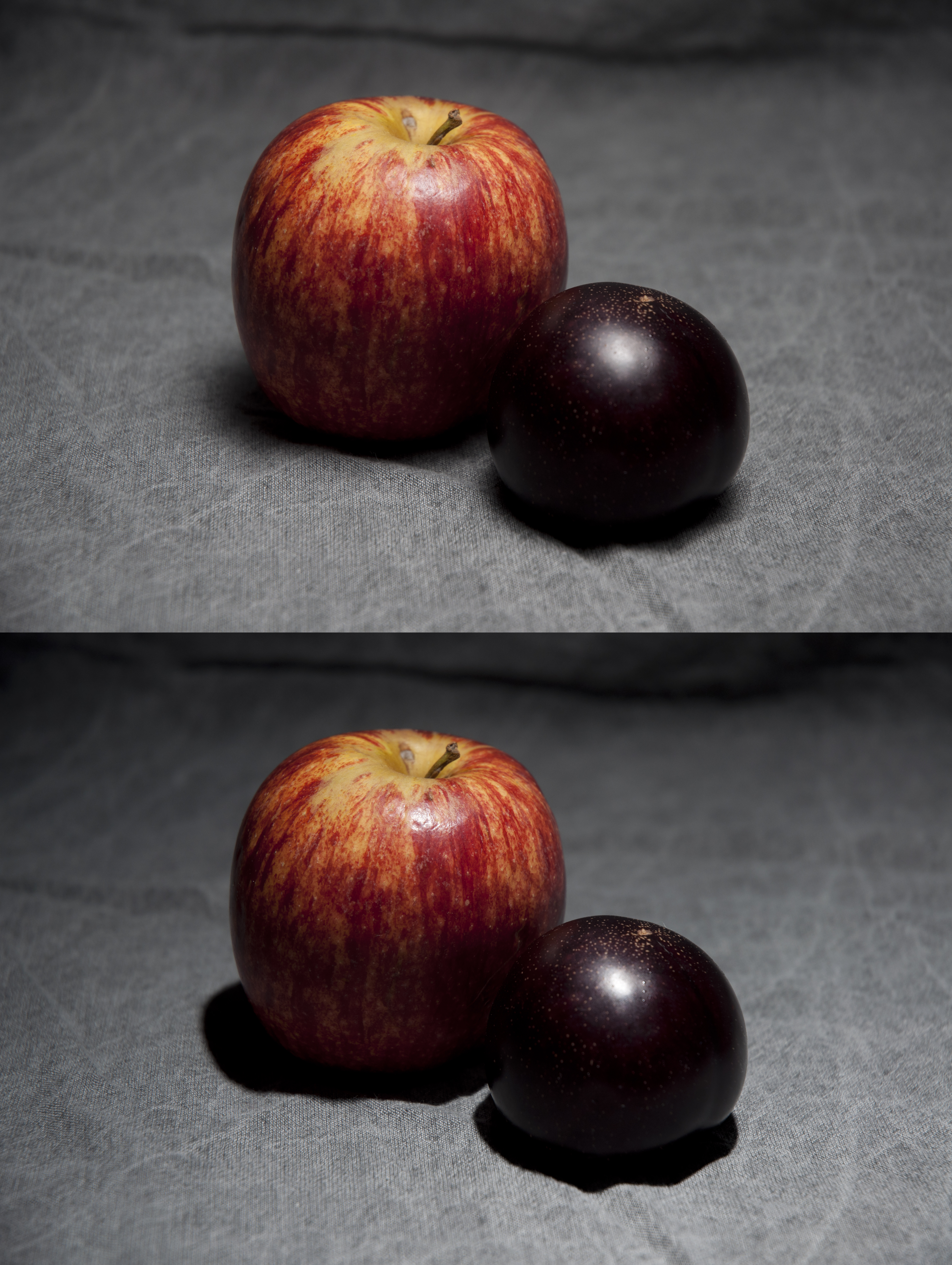
Photograph of fruit with (top) and without (bottom) softbox lighting

A softbox is a type of lighting modifier used in photography and videography. It belongs to the group of devices designed to produce soft light. All the various soft light types create even and diffused light by transmitting light through some scattering material, or by reflecting light off a second surface to diffuse the light. One of the best-known forms of reflective source is the umbrella light, where the light from the bulb is "bounced" off the inside of a metalized umbrella to create an indirect "soft" light.

A softbox is an enclosure that surrounds a light source with reflective side and back panels and a diffusing material at the front to soften and spread the light.

The sides and back of the box are lined with a bright surface – an aluminized fabric surface or an aluminum foil, to act as an efficient reflector. In some commercially available models the diffuser is removable to allow the light to be used alone as a floodlight or with an umbrella reflector.

A softbox can be used with either flash or continuous light sources such as fluorescent lamps or "hot lights" such as quartz halogen bulbs or tungsten bulbs. If softbox lights are used with "hot" light sources, the photographer must be sure the softbox is heat rated for the wattage of the light to which it is attached in order to avoid fire hazard.

== Types of softbox ==
The larger a softbox is in relation to the subject, the softer its light. Rectangular softboxes resemble window light and suit most purposes; square ones are often used for head-and-shoulders portraits; octagonal softboxes ("octaboxes") produce round, natural-looking catchlights in the subject's eyes; and narrow strip softboxes are used as rim lights and to create long, even highlights with soft edges.

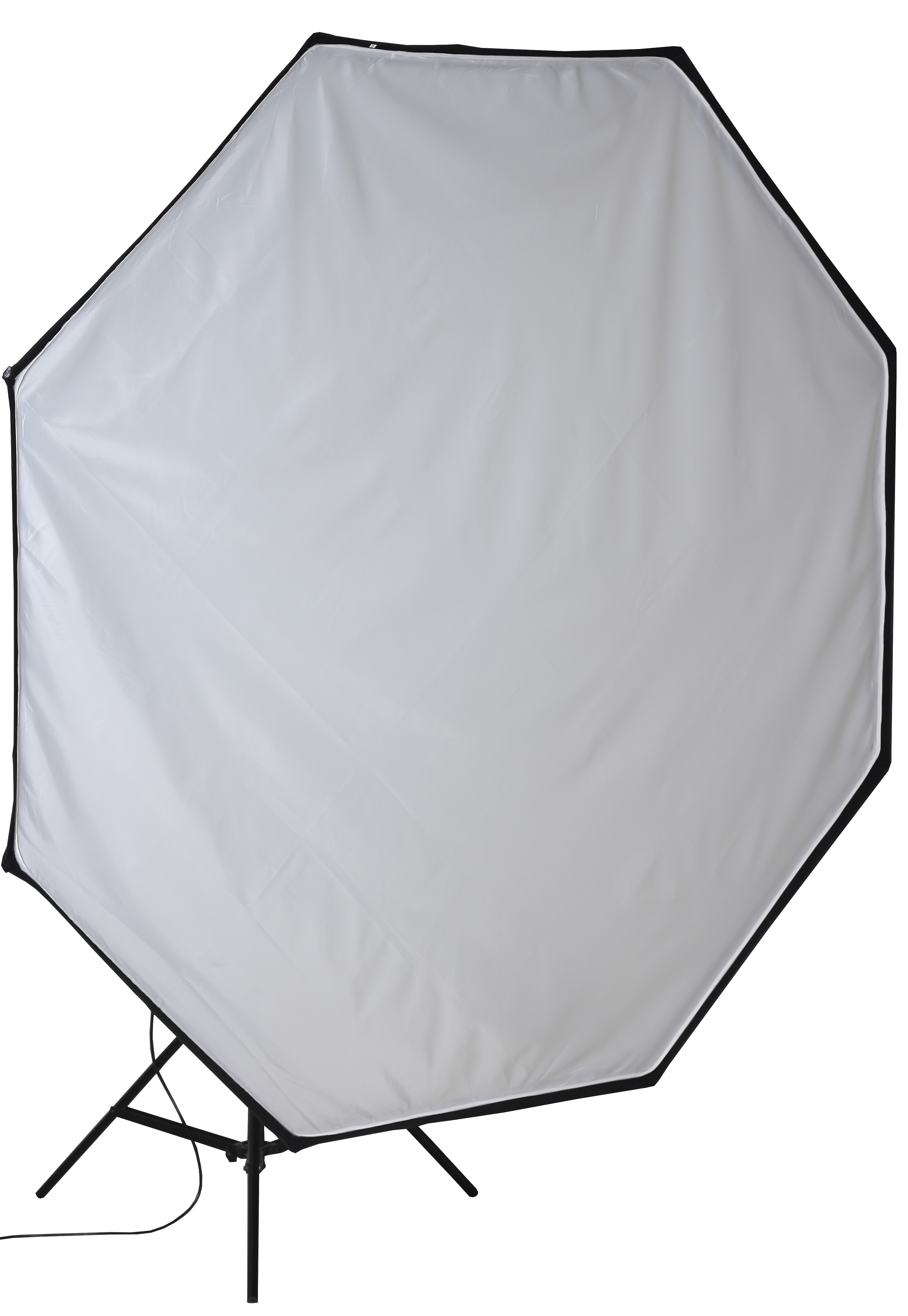
Octabox

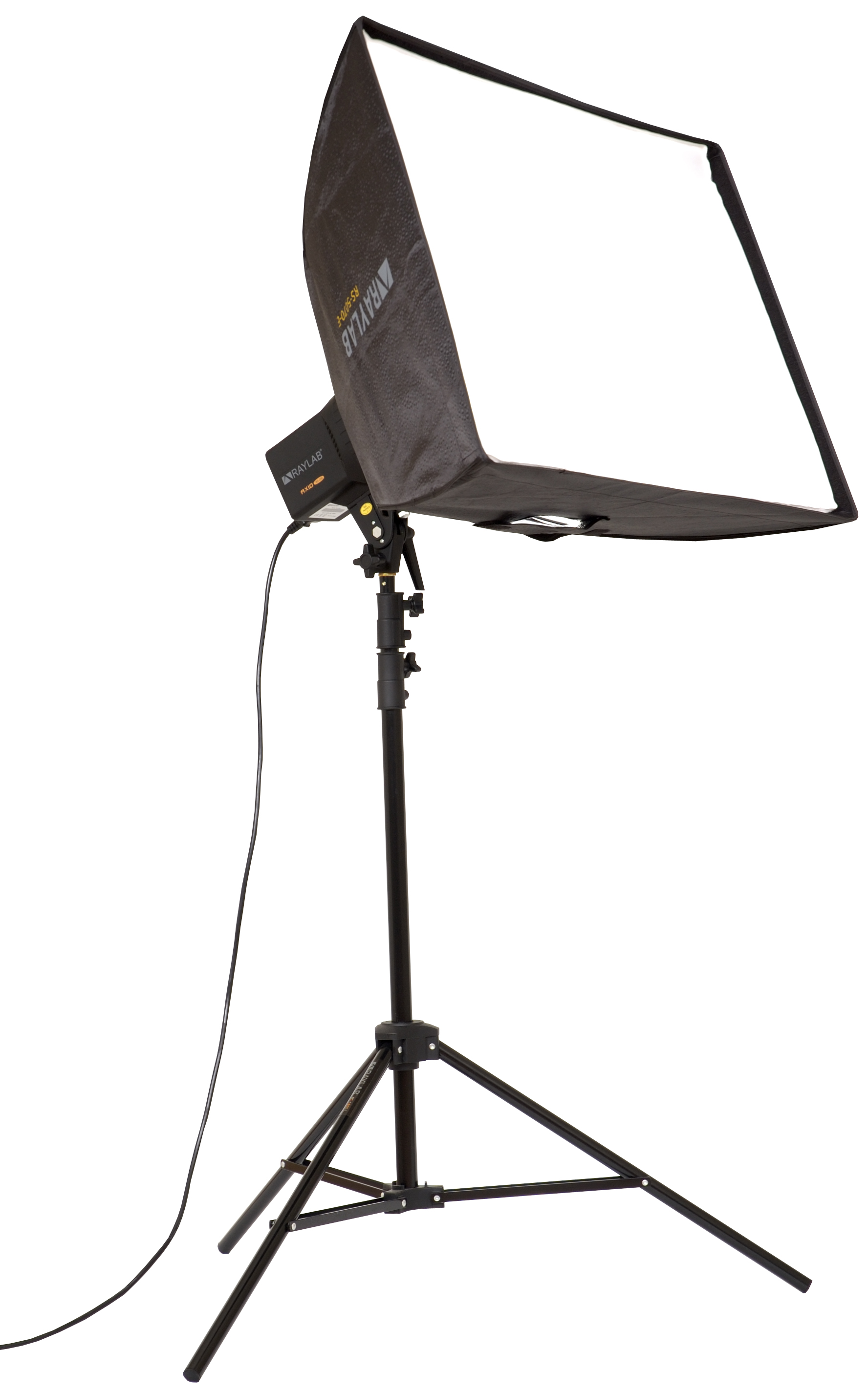
Squarebox

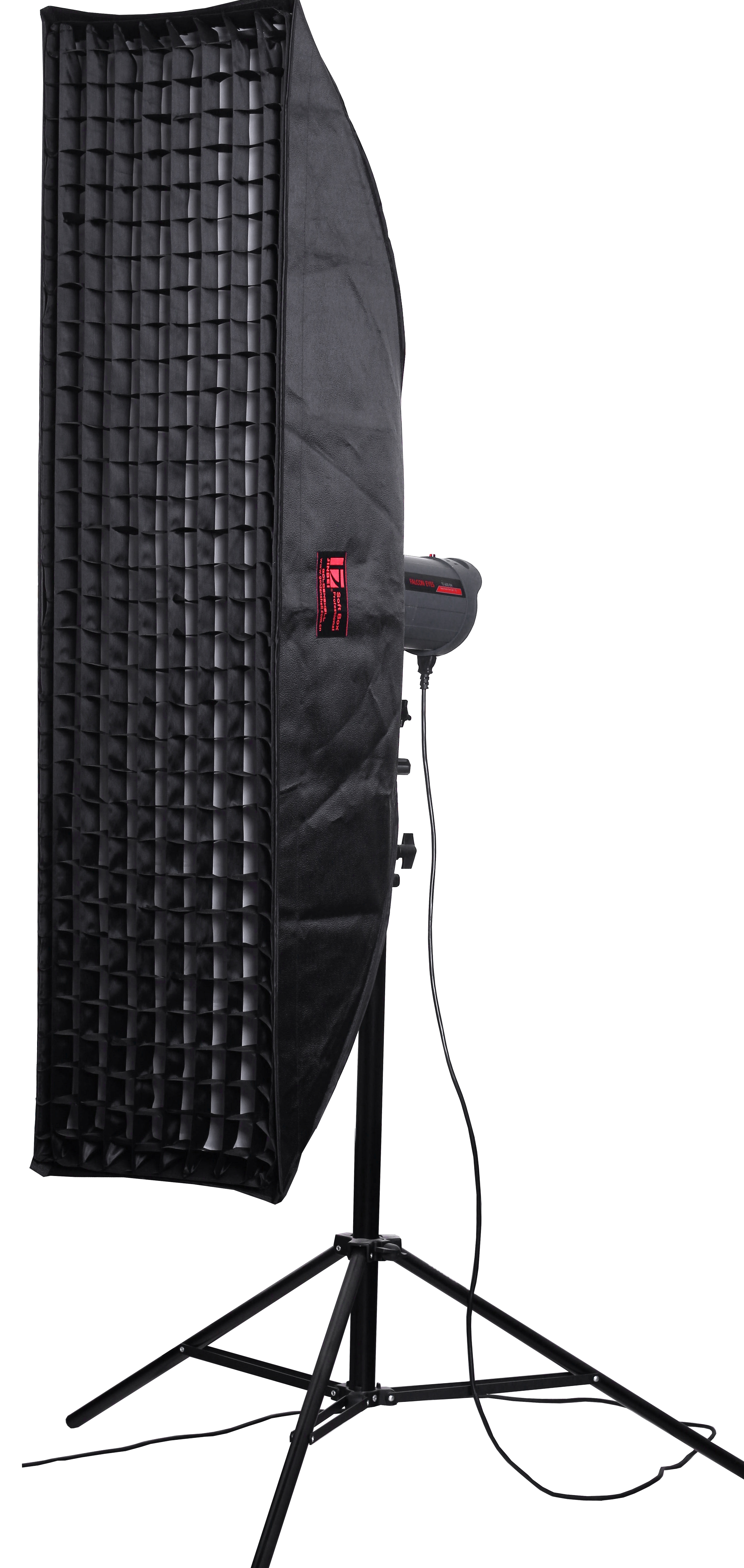
Stripbox

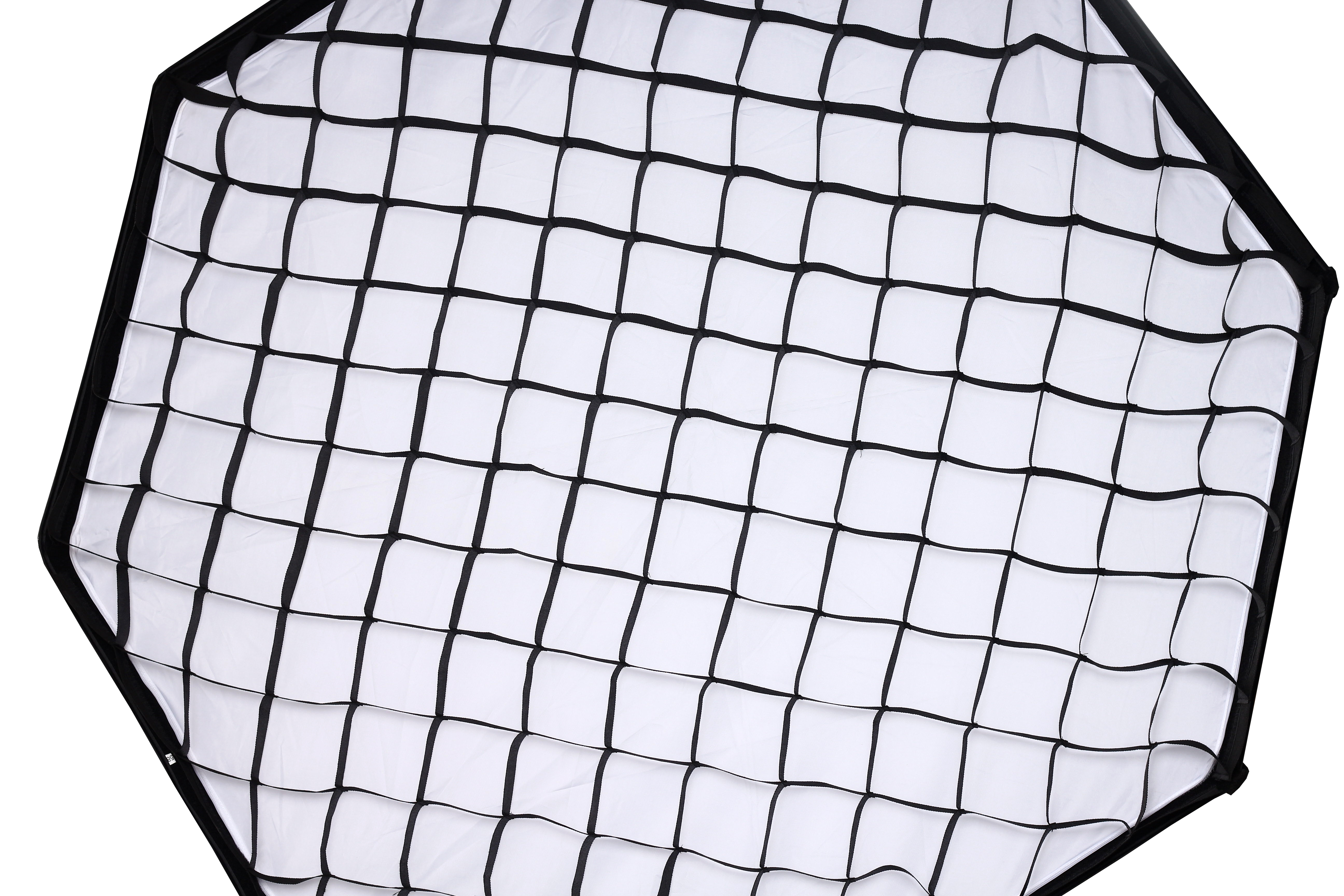
Octagon honeycomb grid

== See also ==
- Beauty dish
- Light tent
- Reflector (photography)
- Speed ring
- Striplight
