= Available light =

Visible EM radiation not generated by special equipment, in photography

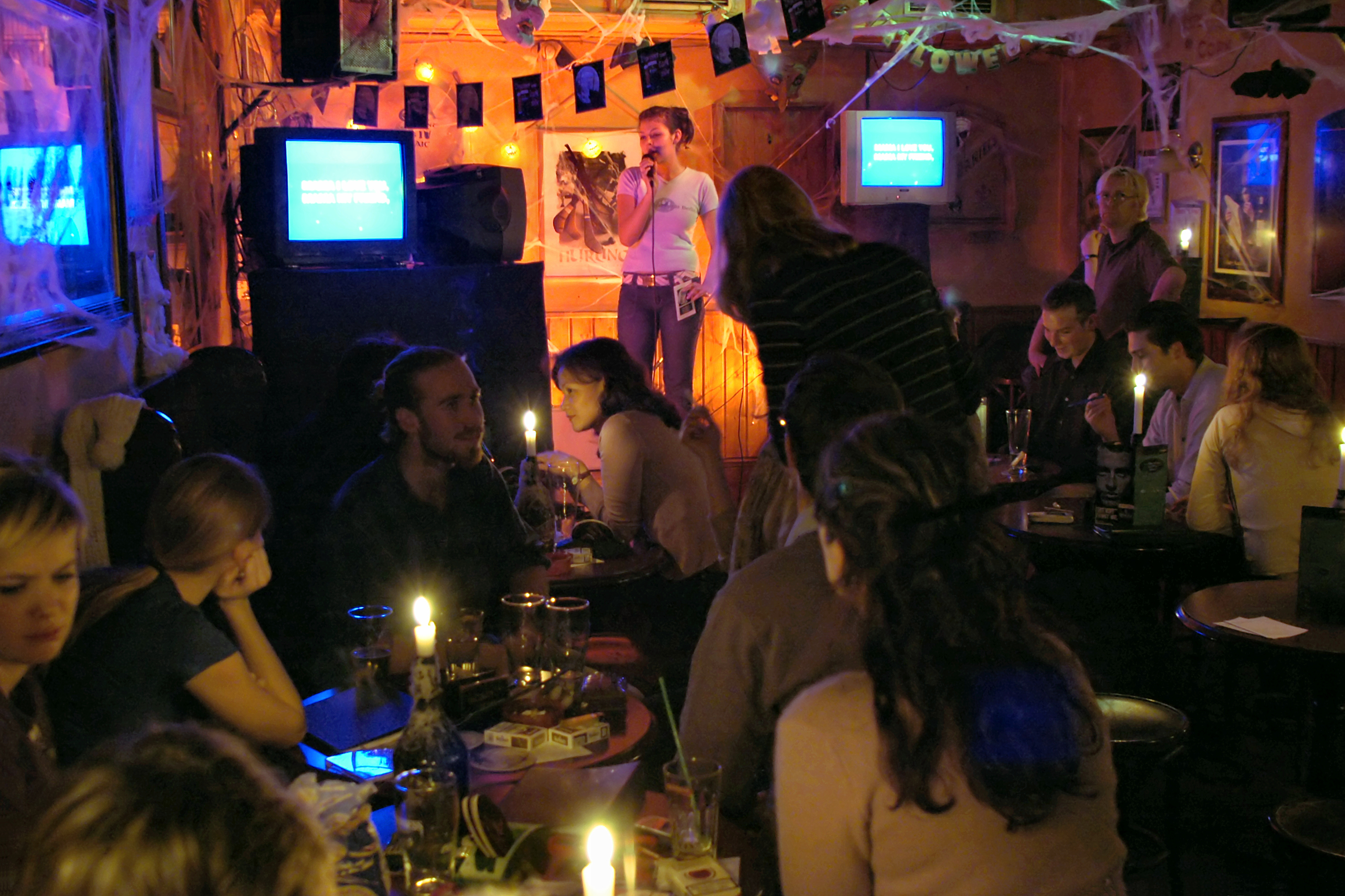
Available light used in a picture of a karaoke event in an Irish pub in Hamburg

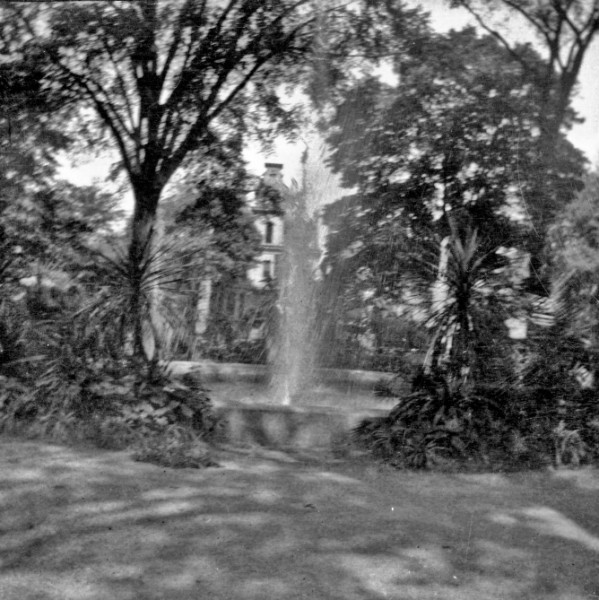
Example of photographic use of available light in the early 20th century

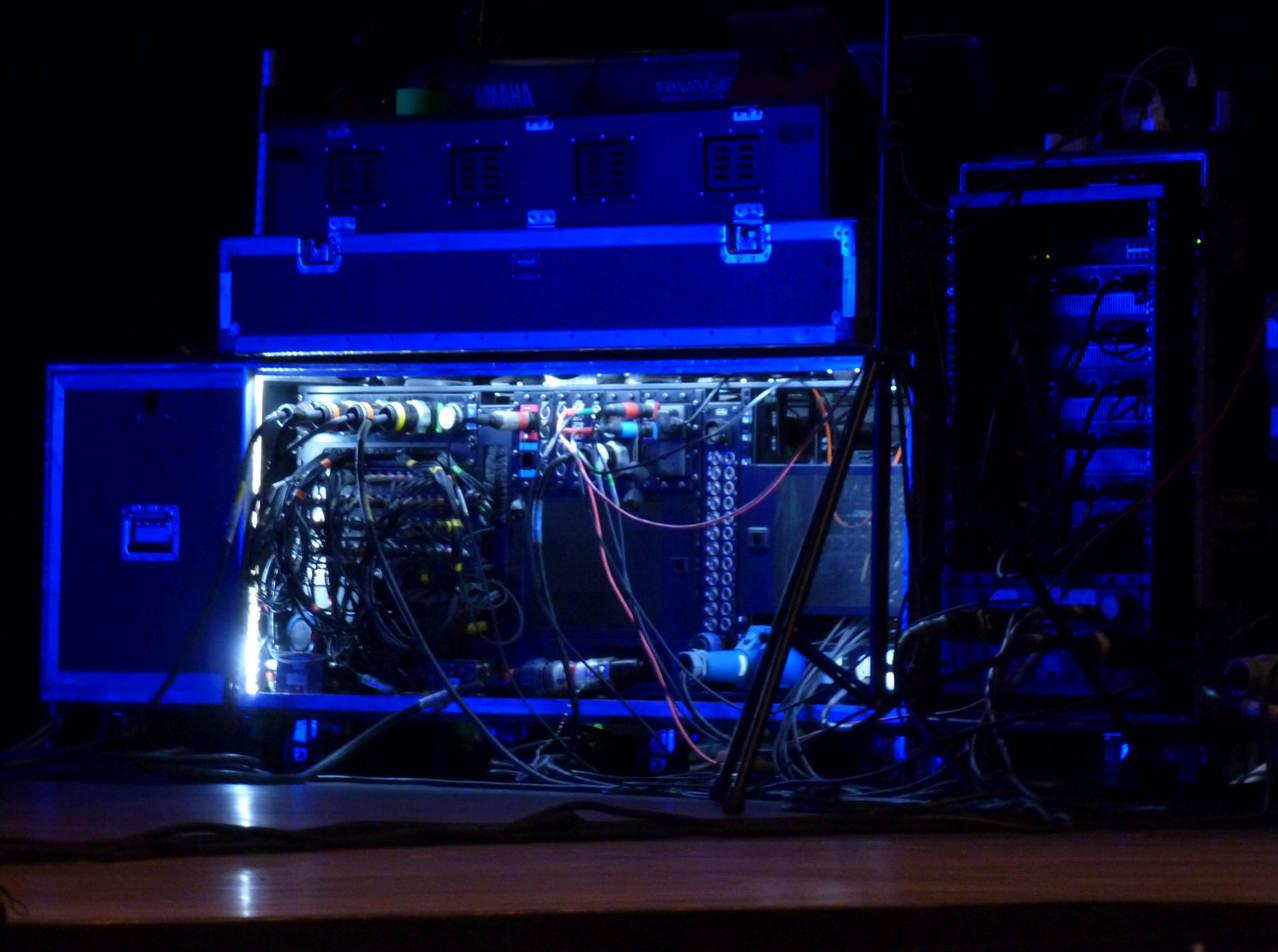
Photography of the sound reinforcement system prior to a pop concert, wherein the room was mainly dark except the blue spotlight. Though the exposure time of 1/4 second at 180 mm focal length (equivalent to 35 mm film) would typically result in a relatively strong blur, the image is quite sharp which is the result of the image stabilizer of the employed camera.

In photography and cinematography, available light (also called ambient light or practical light) refers to any source of light that is not explicitly supplied by the photographer for the purpose of taking pictures. The term usually refers to light sources in the surrounding environment that are present naturally (such as sunlight or moonlight) or artificial lighting that is already pre-existing (such as street lights or room lights). It generally excludes flashes, although arguably flash lighting provided by other photographers shooting simultaneously in the same space could be considered available light. Light sources that affect the scene and are included in the actual frame are called practical light sources, or simply practicals.

Available light is an important factor in candid photography in order not to disturb the subjects.

The use of available light may pose a challenge for a photographer. The brightness and direction of the light is often not adjustable, except perhaps for indoor lighting. This will limit the selection of shutter speeds, and may require the use of shades or reflectors to manipulate the light. It can also influence the time, location, and even orientation of the photo shoot to obtain the desired lighting conditions. Available light can often also produce a color cast with color photography.

Levels of ambient light are most frequently considered relative to additional lighting used as fill light, in which case the ambient light is normally treated as the key light. In some cases, ambient light may be used as a fill, in which case additional lighting provides the stronger light source, for example in bounce flash photography. The relative intensity of ambient light and fill light is known as the lighting ratio, an important factor in calculating contrast in the finished image.

Generally, the technology of digital photography extended the range for available light photography strongly. While it is possible to make decent images of night scenes in streets or in rooms without flash even with the cameras of standard smartphones of 2022, this was virtually impossible with the former photographic film, with the only exception of highly sensitive black and white film which had various drawbacks.

== Sources ==
=== Indoor ===
- Candles
- Fluorescent lamps
- Lightbulbs
- Light shining in a window

=== Outdoor ===
- The Aurora
- Clouds
- Fires
- Fireworks
- Flashlights (torches)
- Lanterns
- Light pollution
- Lightning
- The moon
- The sky
- Stars (very dim)
- Street lights
- The sun (see also golden hour)

== See also ==
- Low-key lighting
- High-key lighting
- Illuminance
- Lux
