= Golden hour (photography) =

First and last hour of sunlight during the day

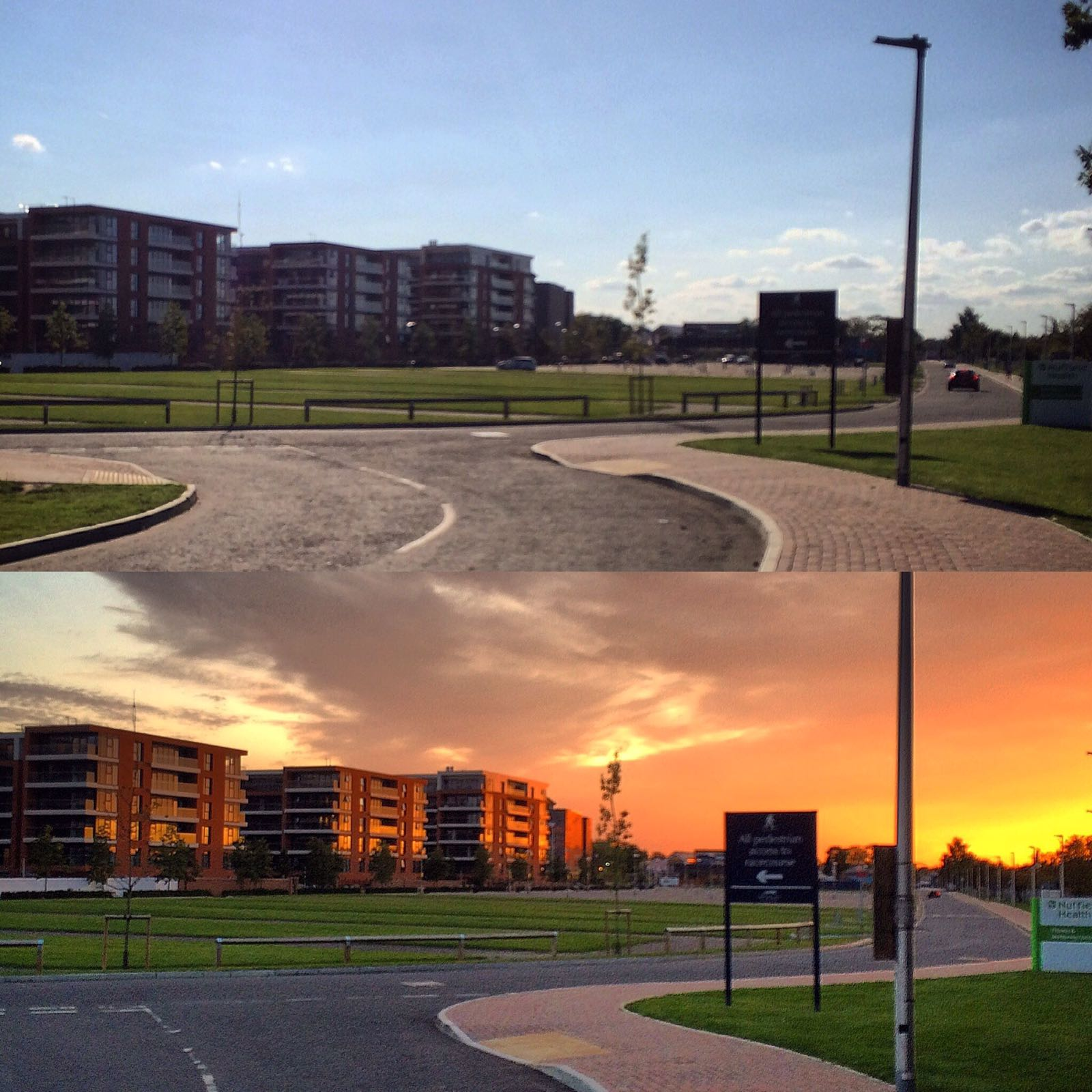
Comparison of daylight versus the golden hour at Newbury Racecourse

In photography, the golden hour is the period of daytime shortly after sunrise or before sunset, during which daylight is redder and softer than when the sun is higher in the sky.

The golden hour is also sometimes called the magic hour, especially by cinematographers and photographers. Some cinematographers, however, use magic hour for the time between sunset and nightfall, when there is no direct sunlight.

The period of time shortly before the golden hour at sunrise, or after it at sunset, is called the "blue hour". This is when the sun is below the horizon, by about 3° to 10° depending on the definition used, when residual, indirect sunlight takes on a predominantly blue shade, and there are no sharp shadows because the sun either has not risen, or has already set.

== Details ==
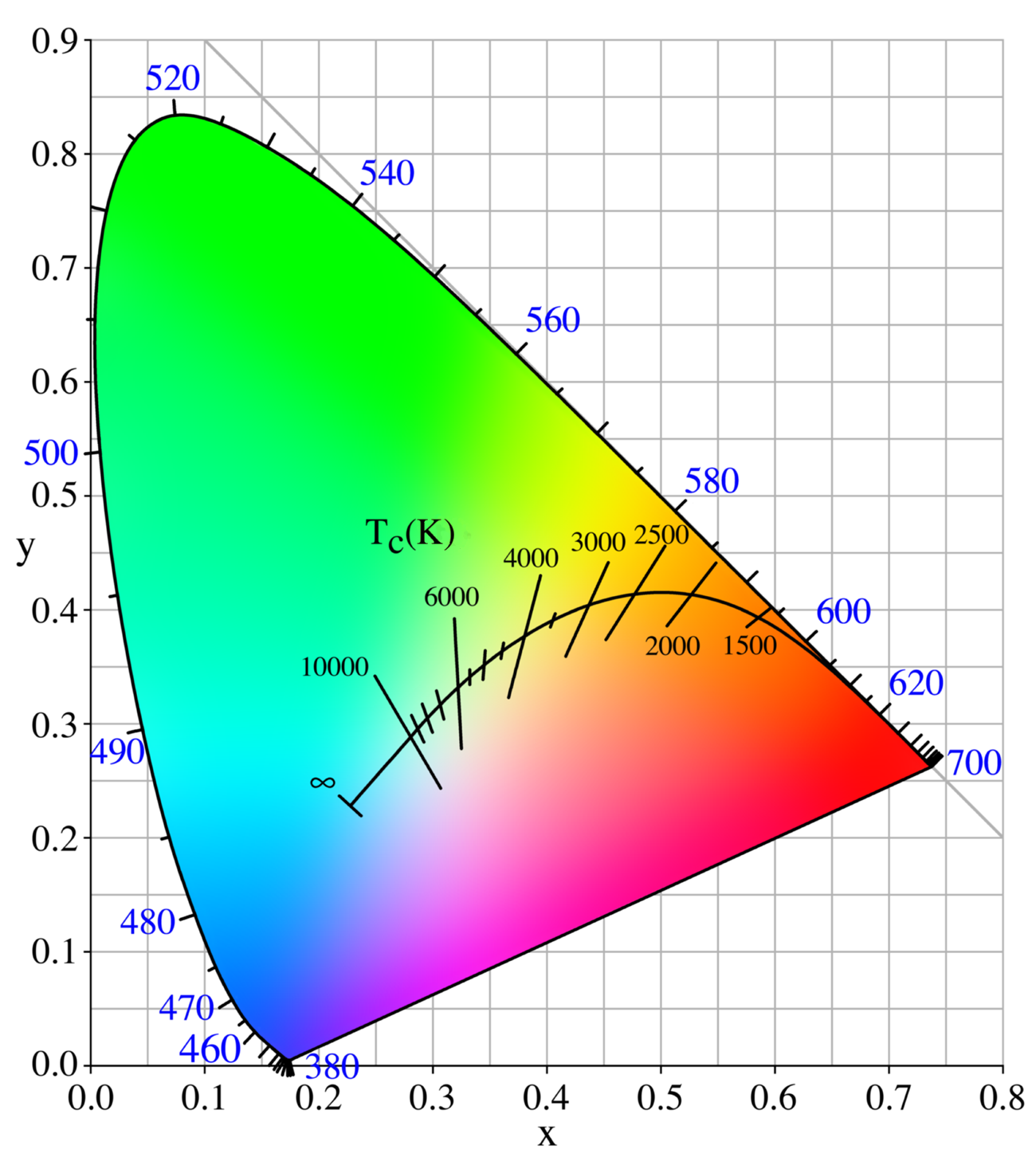
The color temperature of daylight varies with the time of day. It tends to be around 2,000 K shortly after sunrise or before sunset, around 3,500 K during "golden hour", and around 5,500 K at midday. The color temperature can also change significantly with altitude, latitude, season, and weather conditions.

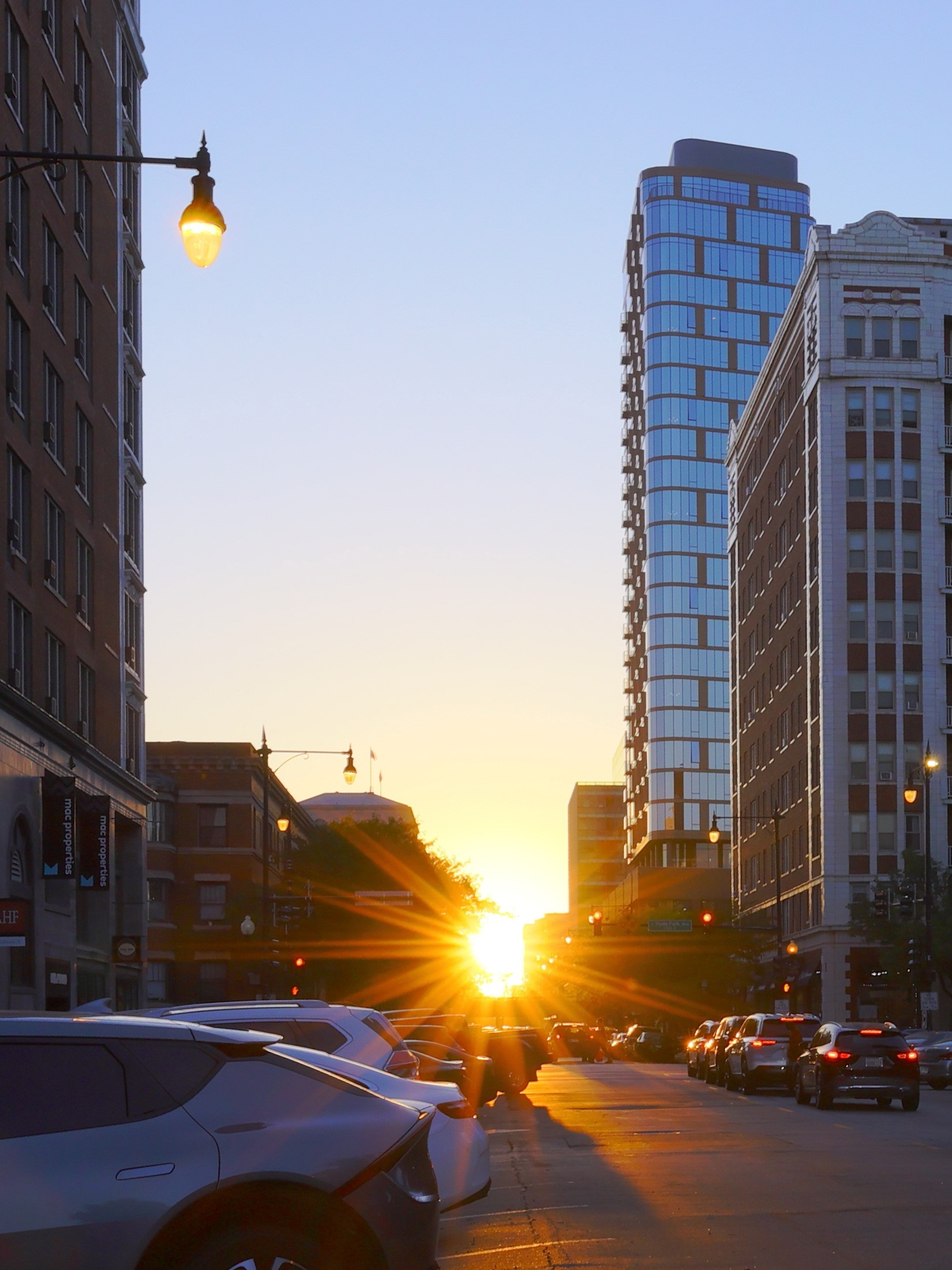
Near the equinoxes in Chicago the sunsets occur in the middle of east-west streets (an event known as Chicagohenge), creating intriguing golden hour photography opportunities like this diffraction spike in an urban canyon. Similar phenomena (such as Manhattanhenge) occur in other parts of the world at various times of the year.

When the sun is low above the horizon, sunlight rays must penetrate the atmosphere for a greater distance, reducing the intensity of the direct light, so that more of the illumination comes from indirect light from the sky, reducing the lighting ratio. This is technically a type of lighting diffusion. More blue light is scattered, so if the sun is present, its light appears more reddish. In addition, the sun's low angle above the horizon produces longer shadows.

The term hour is used figuratively; the effect has no clearly defined duration and varies according to season and latitude. Nor is there a single definition in terms of the sun's altitude: photography planning applications variously use 0° to 6° or 0° to 10° above the horizon, or 4° below to 6° above it, and the timeanddate.com website gives 6° below to 6° above. The character of the lighting is determined by the sun's altitude, and the time for the sun to move from the horizon to a specified altitude depends on a location's latitude and the time of year. In Los Angeles, California, at an hour after sunrise or an hour before sunset, the sun has an altitude of about 10–12°. For a location closer to the Equator, the same altitude is reached in less than an hour, and for a location farther from the equator, the altitude is reached in more than one hour. For a location sufficiently far from the equator, the sun may not reach an altitude of 10°, and the golden hour lasts for the entire day in certain seasons.

In the middle of the day, the bright overhead sun can create strong highlights and dark shadows. The degree to which overexposure can occur varies because different types of film and digital cameras have different dynamic ranges. This harsh lighting problem is particularly important in portrait photography, where a fill flash is often necessary to balance lighting across the subject's face or body, filling in strong shadows that are usually considered undesirable.

Because the contrast is less during the golden hour, shadows are less dark, and highlights are less likely to be overexposed. In landscape photography, the warm color of the low sun is often considered desirable to enhance the colours of the scene. It is often preferred for portrait photography when diffuse, warm light is wanted.

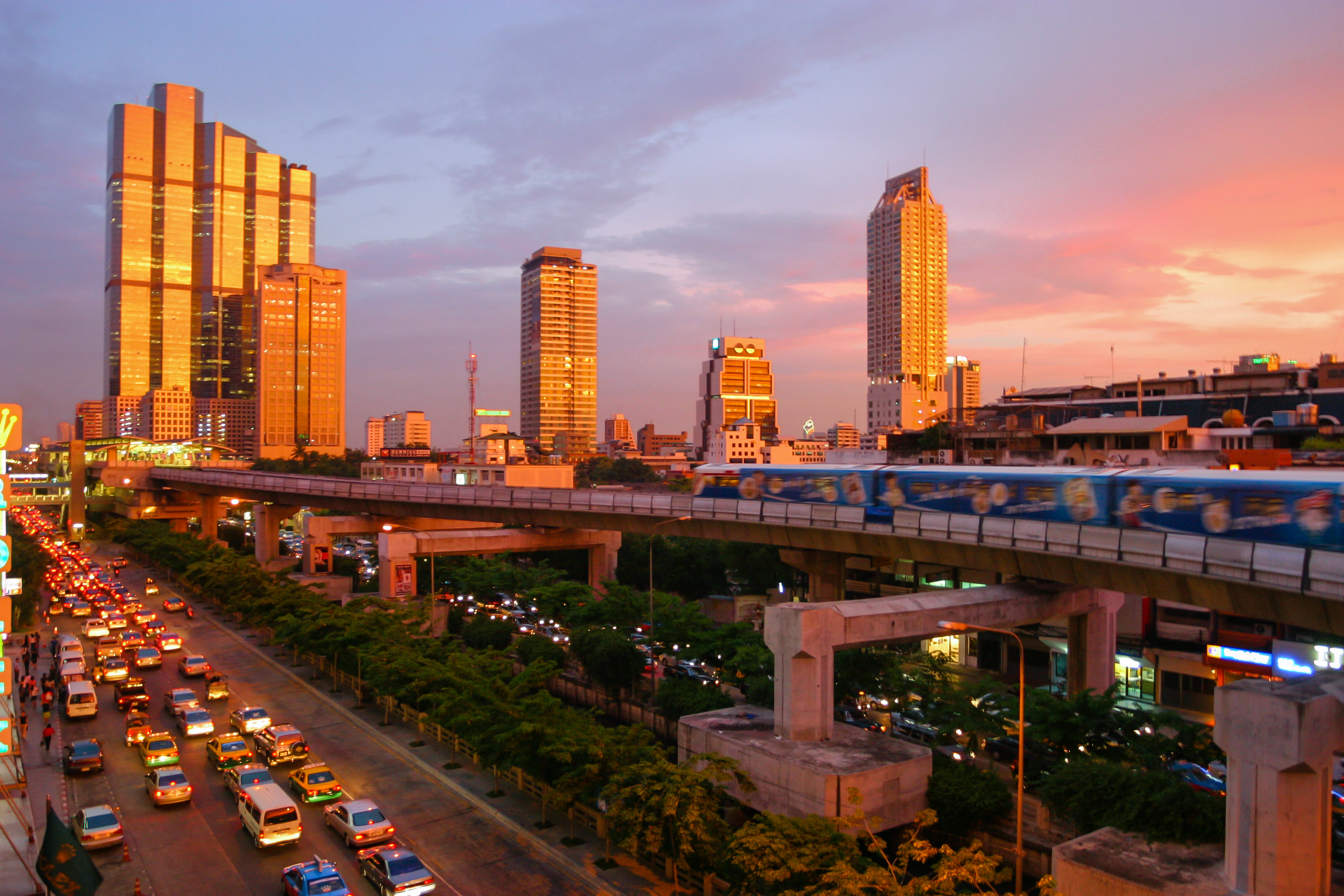
Bangkok during the golden hour

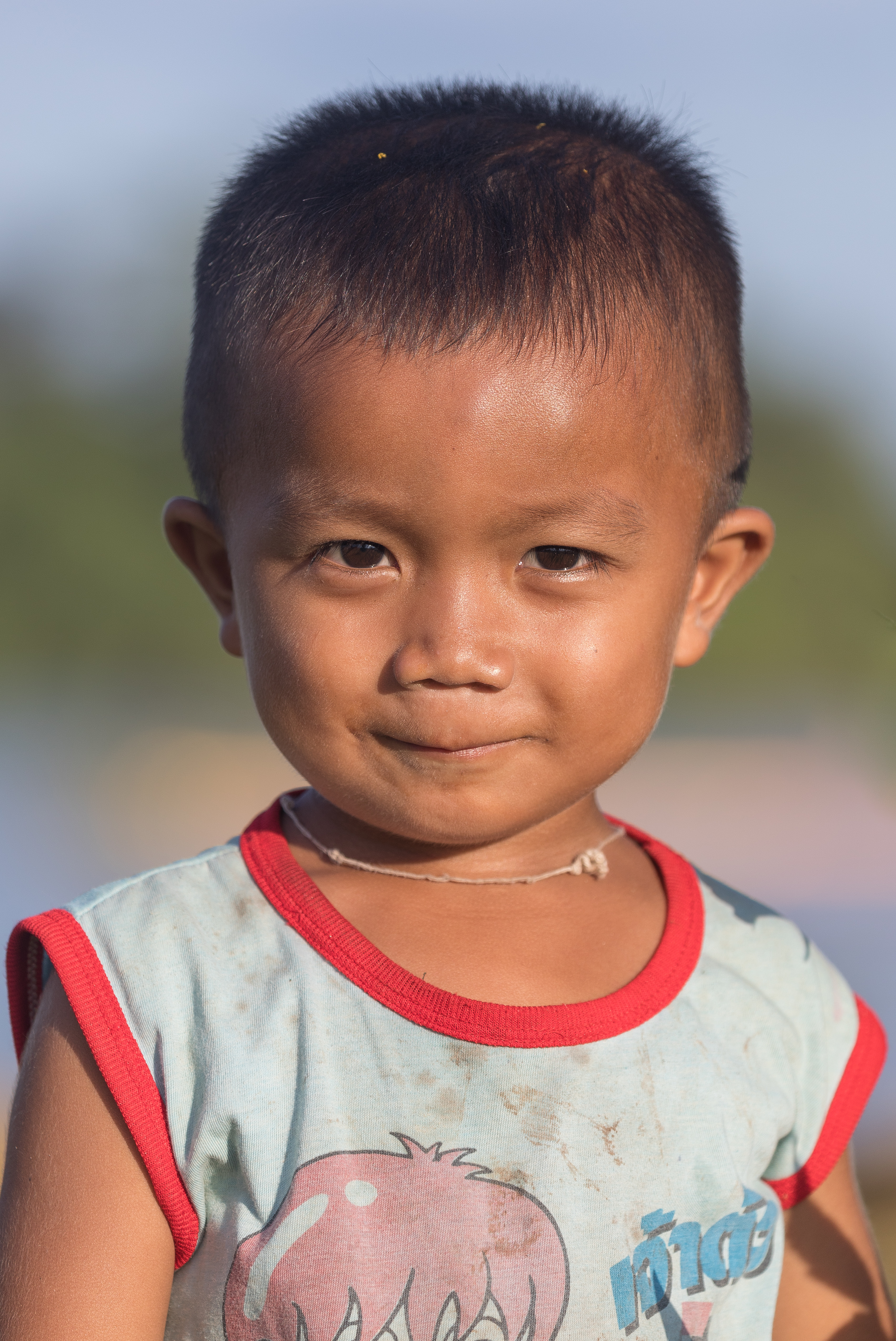
Portrait photo taken during the golden hour

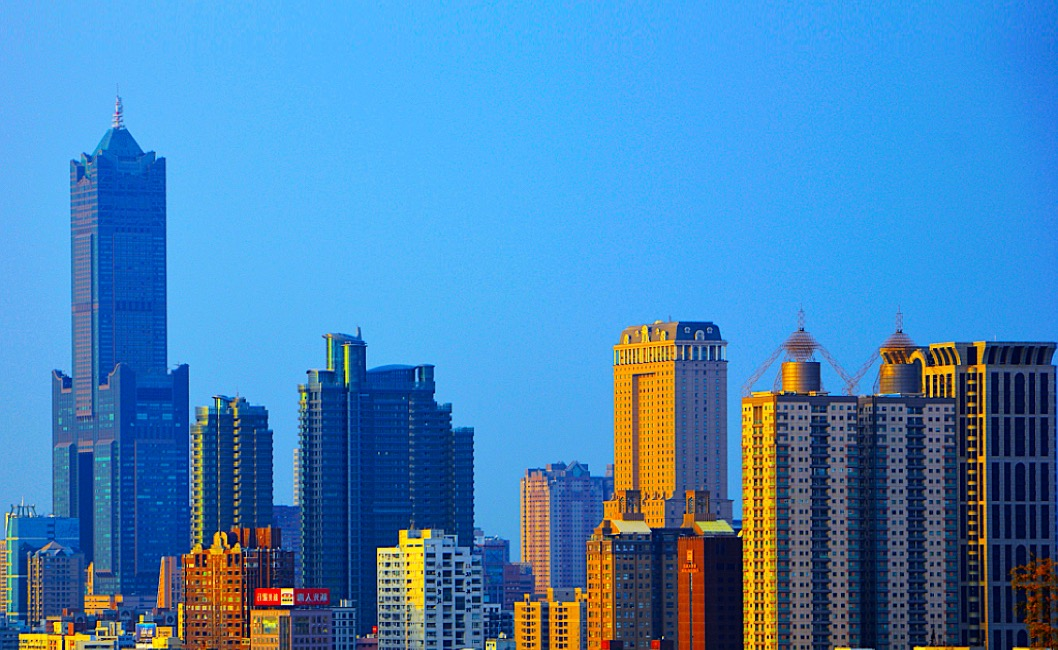
Golden hour at downtown Kaohsiung Taiwan

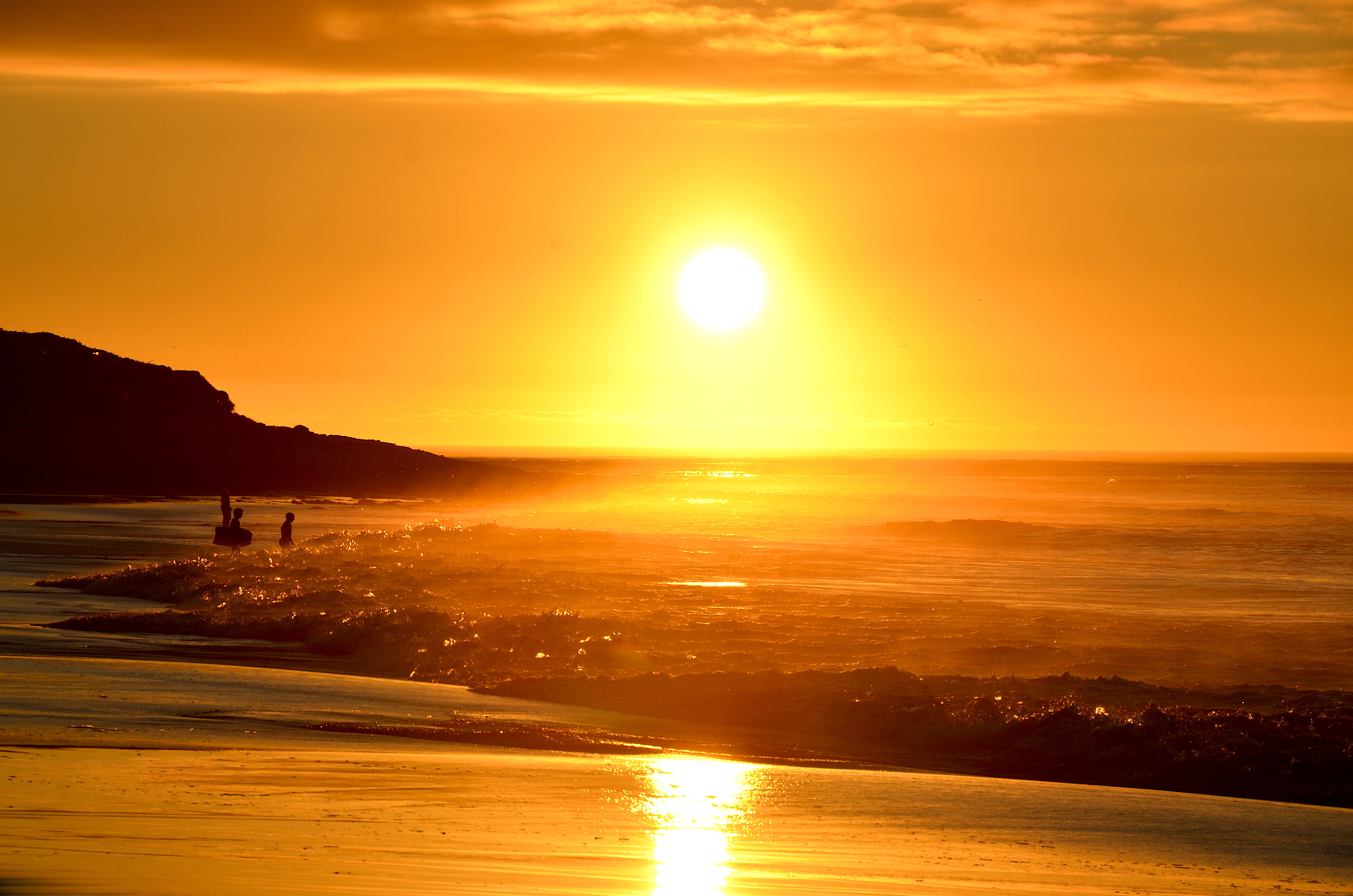
Golden hour at Long Beach, Noordhoek, Cape Town in South Africa

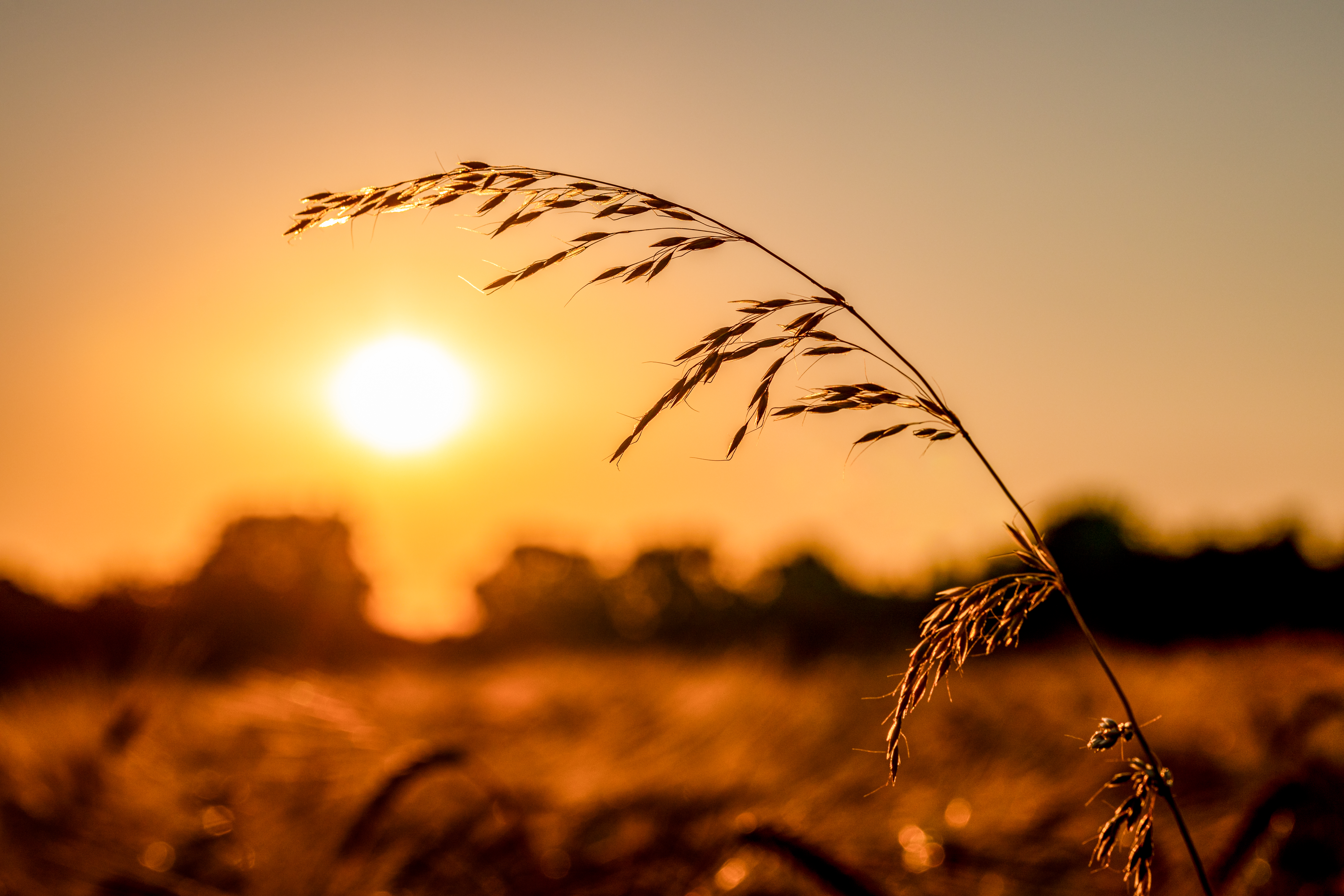
A blade of grass in a barley field

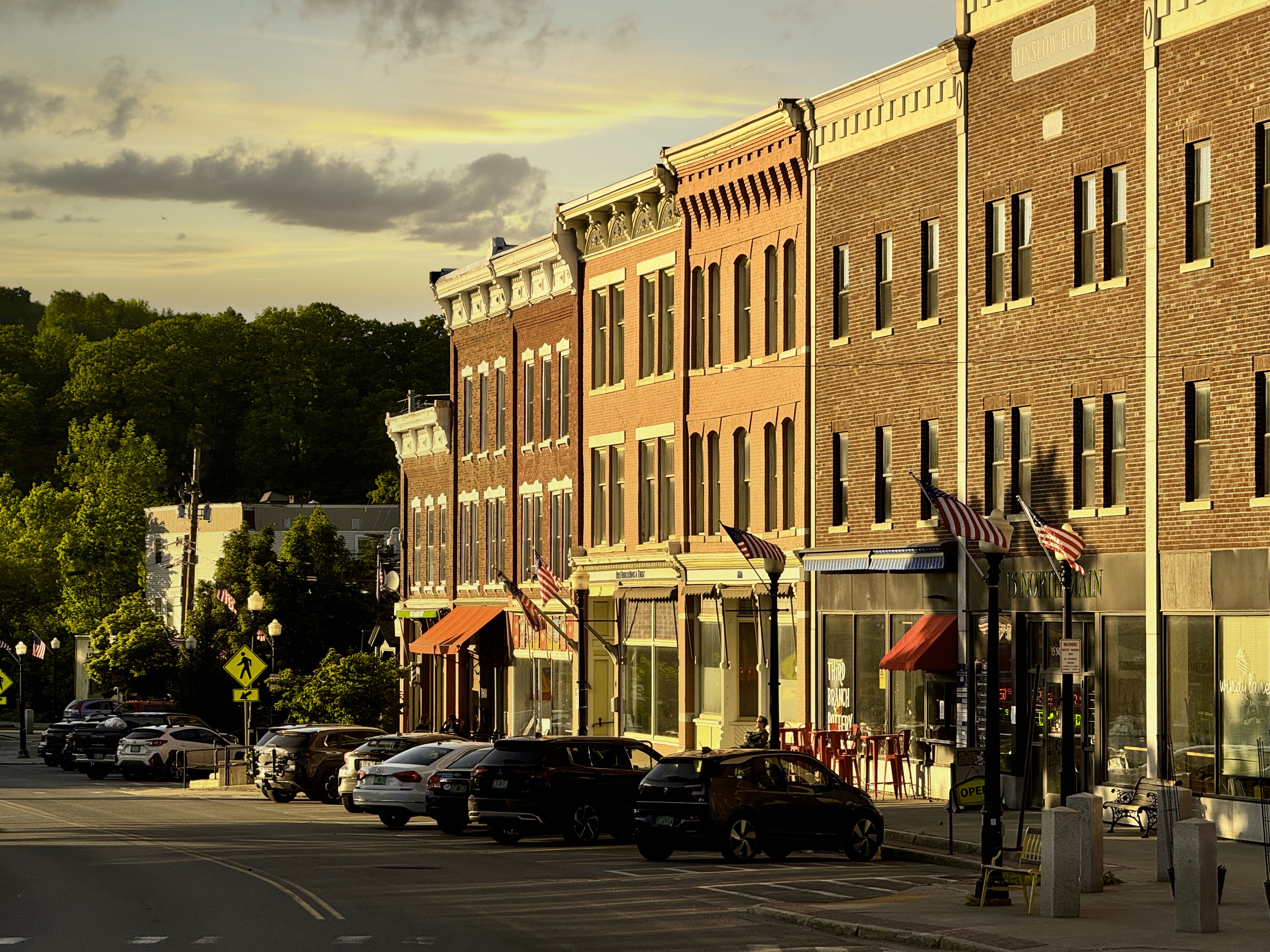
Randolph, Vermont

== In film ==
The 1978 film Days of Heaven was acclaimed for its cinematography, much of which was shot during what its director, Terrence Malick, called the "magic hour". Its cinematographer, Néstor Almendros, who won the Academy Award for Best Cinematography for the film, described this as the time between sunset and nightfall, lasting only about twenty minutes a day.

== See also ==
- Alpenglow
- Blue hour

== Bibliography ==
- Bermingham, Alan. 2003. Location Lighting for Television. Boston: Focal Press. ISBN 0-240-51937-X
- Lynch, David K., and William Livingston. 1995. Color and Light in Nature. Cambridge: Cambridge University Press. ISBN 0-521-46836-1
- Lynch-Johnt, Barbara A., and Michelle Perkins. 2008. Illustrated Dictionary of Photography: The Professional's Guide to Terms and Techniques. Buffalo, NY: Amherst Media, Inc. ISBN 978-1-58428-222-8
- Singleton, Ralph S., and James A. Conrad. 2000. Filmmaker's Dictionary. 2nd ed. Ed. Janna Wong Healy. Hollywood, California: Lone Eagle Publishing Company. ISBN 1-58065-022-8
- Thomas, Woodlief, ed. 1973. SPSE Handbook of Photographic Science and Engineering. New York: John Wiley and Sons. ISBN 0-471-81880-1
