= Low-key photography =

Photography genre consisting of shooting dark-colored scenes

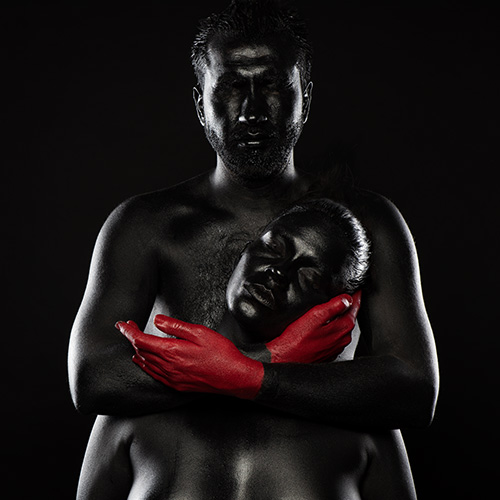
Example of a low-key photograph

Low-key photography is a genre of photography consisting of shooting dark-colored scenes by lowering or dimming the "key" or front light illuminating the scene (low-key lighting), and emphasizing natural or artificial light only on specific areas in the frame. This photographic style is usually used to create a mysterious atmosphere, that only suggests various shapes, often graphic, letting the viewer experience the photograph through subjective interpretation and often implies painting objects or the human body with black non-toxic dyes or pigments.

Renaissance and Baroque, represented by different painting styles including sfumato and chiaroscuro used by artists like Leonardo da Vinci and Rubens), tenebroso (it. dark, mysterious) used by artists such as Caravaggio, Rembrandt, Jusepe de Ribera among others, produced paintings in which black was predominant on the canvas and the light often comes from only one source to achieve dramatic scenes.

Edward Weston, Yousuf Karsh and Irving Penn are among the photographers experienced with the "black on black" technique.

== Etymology ==
According to the Online Etymology Dictionary the term "low-key" appeared in 1895, a term that described something "low-keyed" (relating quiet sound or deep musical tone); according to the Random House Webster's Unabridged Dictionary the term appeared between 1890 and 1895; however, the earliest (known) use of the term dates back to 1830 in the Genius of Liberty.

The "Rembrandt lighting" (or "Rembrandtian light") is a term correlated mostly with low-key portrait photography which uses a light source and a reflector, or two sources of light (a main and a very low intensity fill light). The term was named after the style of lighting the face in most of Rembrandt's self-portraits, but also in other works, such as the Portrait of an Old Man in Red (1652–1654), dominated by Tenebrism.

== History ==
Renaissance and Baroque painters have often used the sfumato, chiaroscuro and later the tenebroso painting modes not only to give a tridimensional impression in their paintings but also to achieve a dramatic atmosphere.

After the decline in popularity of the Pictorialism movement, the new style of photographic Modernism came into vogue, and the public's interest shifted to more sharply focused images. Edward Steichen, Imogen Cunningham and Edward Weston were among the first photographers considered pioneers of low-key photography. Steichen's portrait of J. P. Morgan (1903), Pastoral – Moonlight (1907), published in Camera Work No. 20, Cunningham's Succulent (1920) and Weston's Pepper No. 30 (1930) are considered the earliest low-key photographs.

In art, black regained some of the territory that it had lost during the 19th century. The Russian painter Kasimir Malevich, a member of the Suprematist movement, created the Black Square in 1915, is widely considered the first purely abstract painting. He wrote, "The painted work is no longer simply the imitation of reality, but is this very reality ... It is not a demonstration of ability, but the materialization of an idea."

=== Painting ===
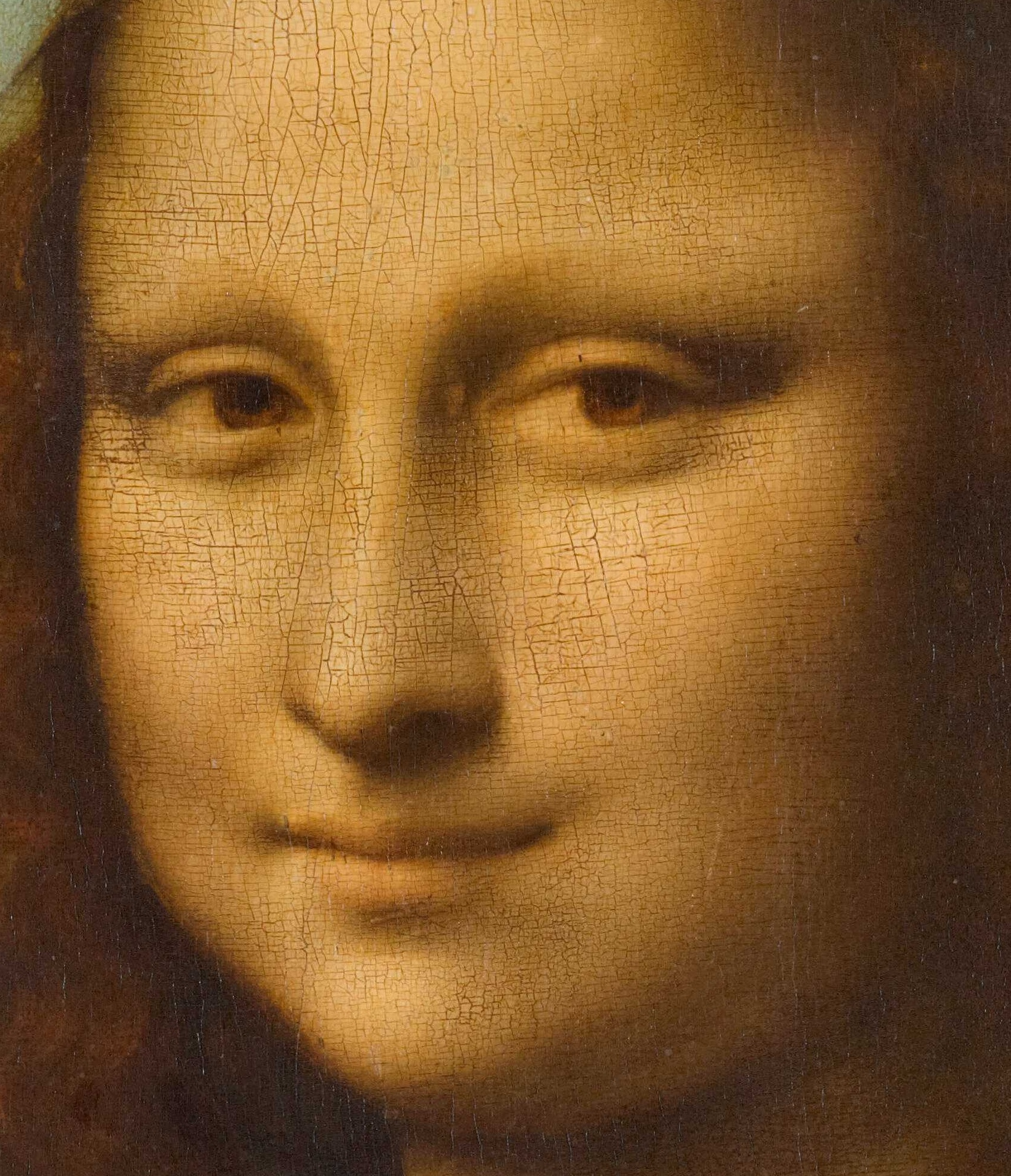
Detail of the face of Leonardo da Vinci's Mona Lisa showing the use of sfumato, particularly in the shading around the eyes

The antagonism between light and shadow is a basic principle of a visual image, regardless of its nature. Leonardo da Vinci pioneered the sfumato technique so he could soften the transition from lighter areas to darker ones in some of his paintings. In his notes about painting, he highlights that light and shadow should intermingle "without lines or borders, in the manner of smoke or beyond the focus plane". Sfumato usually implies using many translucent layers to create a gradual tone spectrum from dark to light, eliminating thus the unwanted sharp contours. The technique is emphasized in the Mona Lisa (1503–1506, Musée du Louvre, Paris).

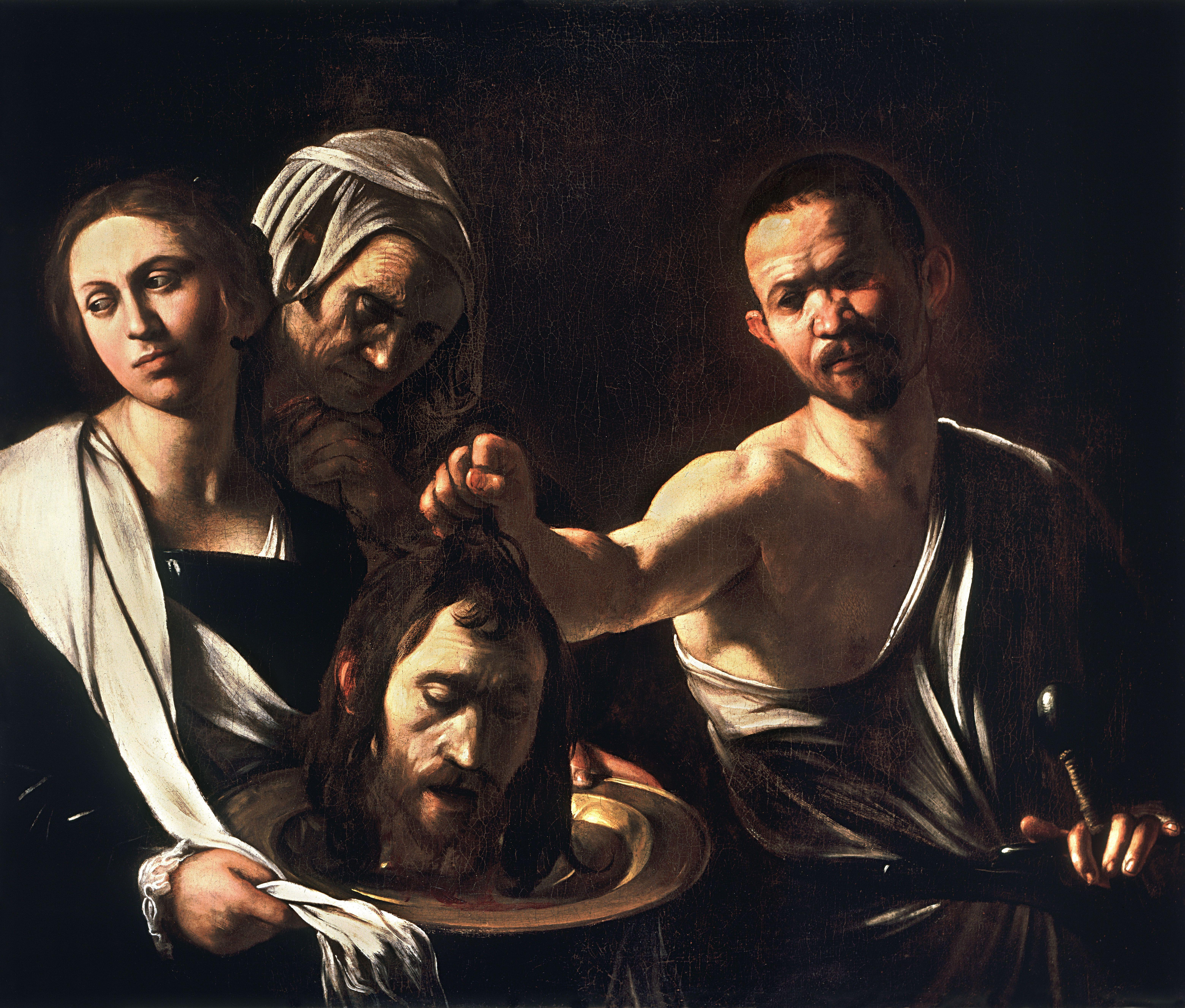
Salome with the Head of John the Baptist, Caravaggio, c. 1607/1610

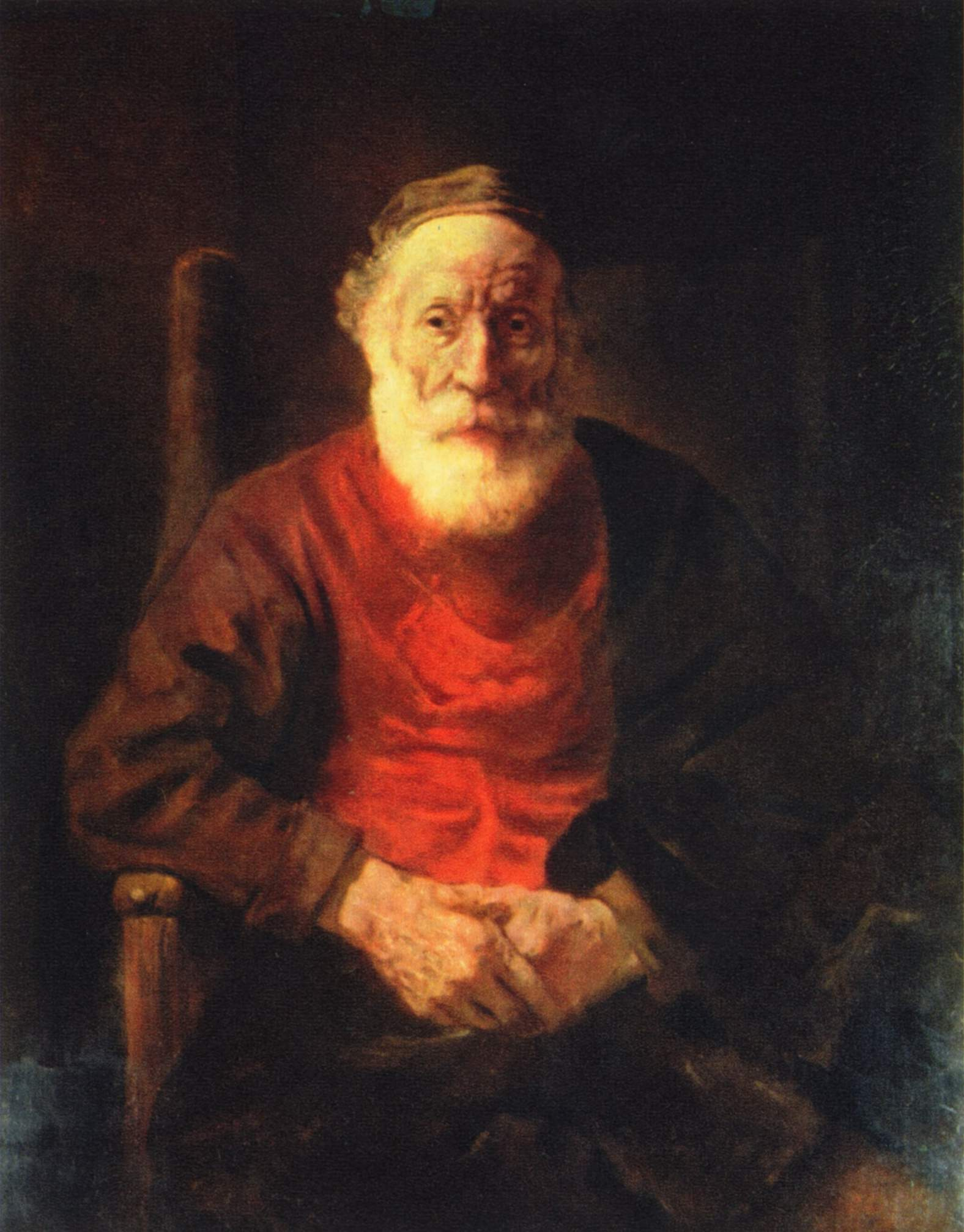
An Old Man in Red, Rembrandt, 1654

On the other hand, chiaroscuro, another oil painting technique, uses strong tonal contrasts between light and dark to model three-dimensional forms, often to dramatic effect. The first use of light-dark three-dimensional shadows – known as "skiagraphia" or "shadow-painting" in Ancient Greece – is traditionally attributed to the Athenian painter of the fifth century BC, Apollodorus (in De Gloria Atheniensum, Plutarch).

Leonardo da Vinci, through his Virgin of the Rocks (1483–1486, Louvre, Paris), influenced the use of chiaroscuro to create the illusion of depth; however, the term is most often associated with the works created in Mannerism and Baroque. In the Renaissance, the technique became essential to all "religious" painters who followed the visions of Bridget of Sweden, who claimed to have seen the light of Christ. In the paintings with religious scenes, the Renaissance artists reassigned this holy light as the predominant source of illumination, relying heavily on the chiaroscuro technique. This compositional approach has been extensively used in Tintoretto's Last Supper (1592–1594). If the religious chiaroscuro of the Renaissance served to create quiet and calm scenes, painters such as Caravaggio, Baglione, Veronese, and Georges de La Tour, had the tendency to use this style for a dramatic effect.

In Baroque, painting relied heavily on the use of shadows for their dramatic effect. Caravaggio has accomplished the dramatic illumination to its greatest extent with his method called tenebrism – a technique that has spread to Europe under the name of caravaggism. The works of Adam Elsheimer's were a turning point between chiaroscuro and tenebrism.

At first glance, a tenebrism painting could look very similar to the one using powerful chiaroscuro effects. However, there is a difference between the two styles: chiaroscuro is a shading technique used especially to give objects the illusion of volume, while tenebrism is a compositional technique that uses very dark shadows, in which some areas of the painting are preserved darkly (sometimes black), allowing only one or two areas of interest to be strongly illuminated; at the same time, the transition from light to dark is not gradual. The style was used for a purely dramatic effect (hence the term "dramatic illumination"), and there was no involvement in trying to create the illusion of three-dimensionality.

This style has been the victim of many negative criticisms in the Baroque, critics accusing artists of using this method to "hide" the mistakes of the paintings. First, Caravaggio's art, which approached the new artistic style in the most radical way, was aimed. Like Caravaggio, Rembrandt as well was accused of hiding his defects in the shades' painting.

Tenebrism gave the darkness a positive value, both iconic and symbolic, creating thus a new aesthetics. Darkness was equivalent to light, because it conditioned the glory and the majesty of the latter. The symbols of light and darkness were expressed in the works of Tintoretto, Caravaggio, Georges de La Tour and Rembrandt.

=== Photography ===
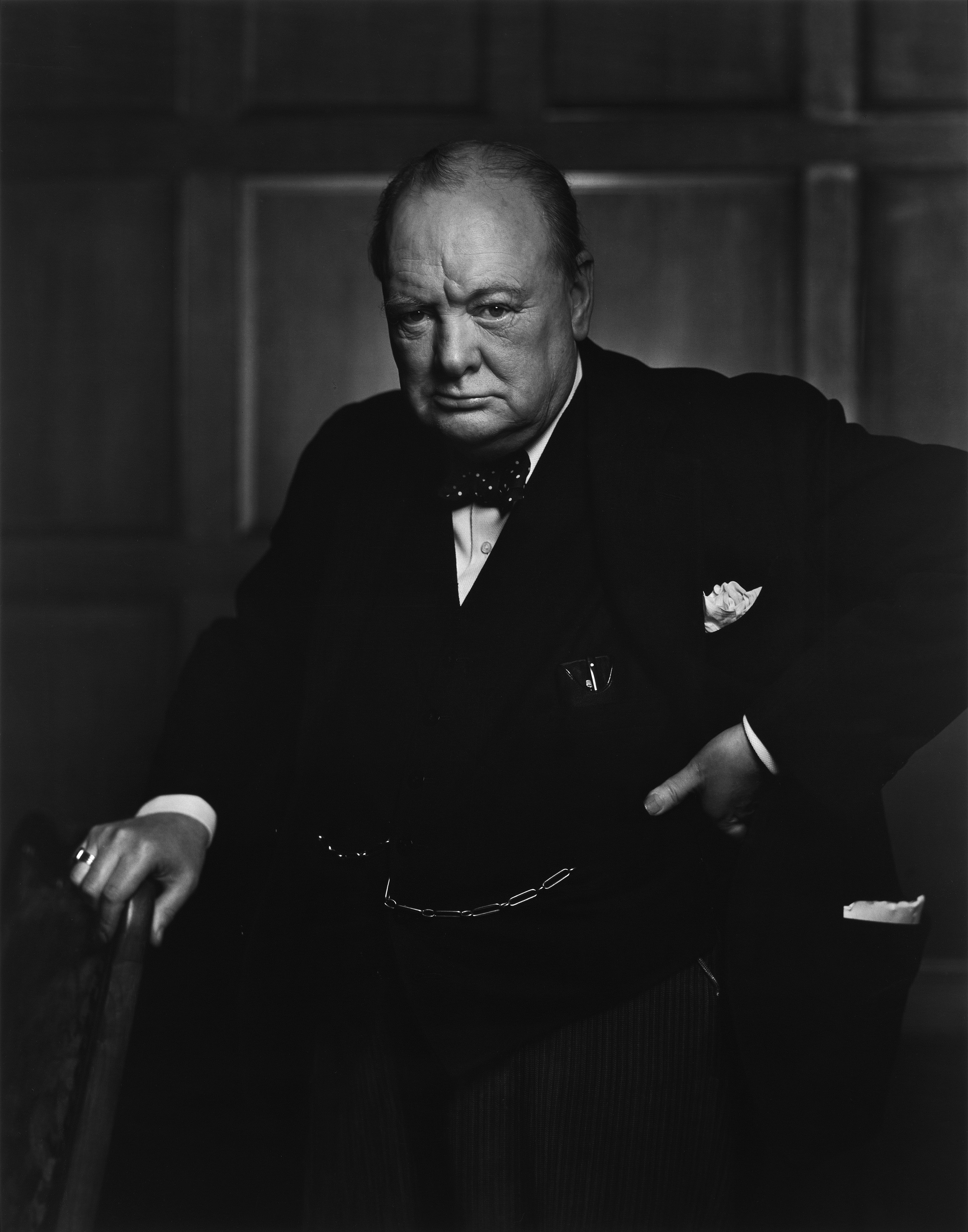
Karsh's The Roaring Lion, 1941

In the photography of one of the most prominent portraitists, the Canadian Yousuf Karsh (1908–2002), the light only outlines the face; it may highlight it more or less intensely, but from an artistic point of view, light plays a secondary role in the scene along with the main subject. His portraits contain large areas of black, and the subject appears like a spot in that achromatic nothingness. Nothing competes with the areas of his subjects' faces being highlighted, which gives the portraits an almost mystical aura.

Thus, in the portrait of Winston Churchill, which according to The Economist is the "most reproduced portrait in the history of photography" and has been described as one of the "most iconic portraits ever shot", only his face is highlighted, while his head is outlined by another, very low light source, coming from the back; in the portrait of Jean Sibelius, the light is reduced even more, with half of the face being in gloom; in Helen Keller with Polly Thompson, both subjects are dressed in black and the background is also entirely black, so the photograph gives an impression of detachment, dissolution; Jasper Johns seems to emerge from a black ocean; the portrait of the French writer François Mauriac is only contoured from semi-profile, only an almost-abstracted line appearing on the black background.

The strong contrast between black and white and the use of this contrast to overcome classical portraits, is characteristic of all these portraits, thus creating a dramatic, enigmatic, mystical atmosphere, abundantly making use of the so-called "active black". Yousuf Karsh is considered to be one of the contemporary artists who adopt the low-key photographic style in the most efficient manner, being called "one of the 20th century's great portrait photographers" by Time magazine.

Other noteworthy examples that deal with black hues photography include Paul Strand's Blind (1916), where the subject is deliberately shadowed in order to create the gloomy atmosphere of the image, and the "Blind" sign is lit; Ansel Adams's Mt. Moran, Teton National Park, natural light falls only on the peak of the mountain, while the rest of the photo is a mixture of dark grey tones; some of Edward Weston's photographs are also illustrative of the low-key style, such as Nautilus (1930), Pepper No. 30 (1930), Cabbage Leaf (1931); Brassaï's Filles de joie, Quartier Italie (1932); Bresson's Nehru Announces Gandhi's Death, (1948). In 1944, Robert Capa takes photos of Picasso in natural light that only highlights the right half of his face, leaving the left one in the shade.

Irving Penn (1917–2009) took several low-key photographs of the American jazz trumpeter and composer Miles Davis.

Among postmodernist photographers, the Australian Bill Henson photographs controversial nudes in low-key, Elad David works mainly with male nudes and in some of them only the busts – no head – of young men, is highlighted, leaving everything else in pitch black. Another artist who created a series of low-key photos exhibited in numerous exhibitions around the world, is the Finnish photographer Juha Arvid Helminen. He named his series The Invisible Empire, and refers to the shield that black colour offers, like a mask between who we truly are and the way society perceives us.

== Technique ==
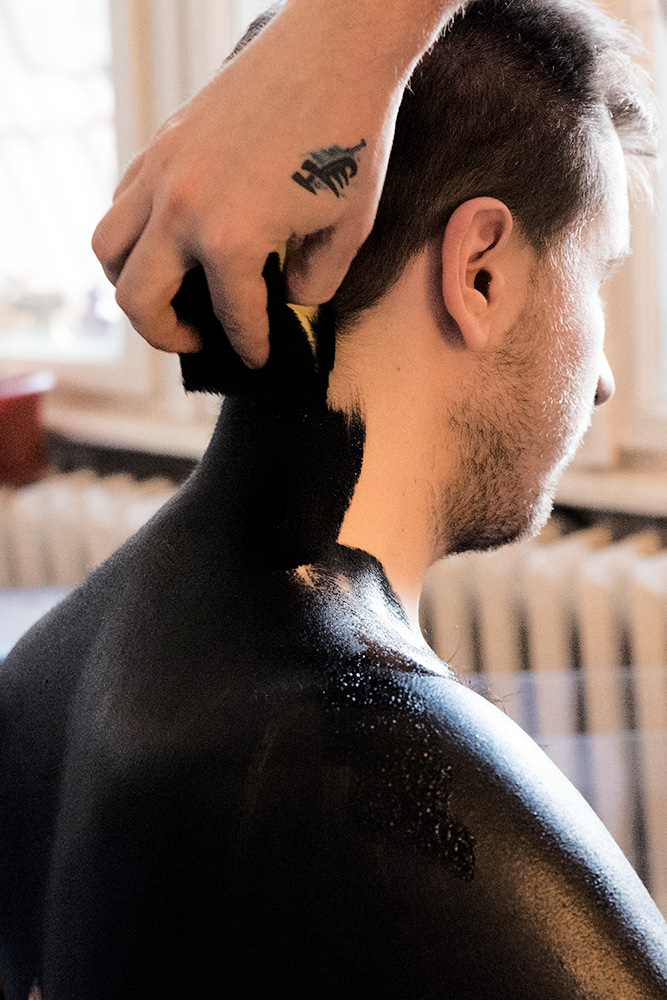
Painting a subject using acrylic black paint mixed with body cream

Taking low-key photographs is possible in dark rooms where light penetrates only through a small window or a single unidirectional soft light, but the best results are achieved by using artificial studio lights. Sometimes, a single directed light source is sufficient. Usually, well-targeted sources are used to get the desired effect, since a large light source could considerably reduce the desired result. Special attention is paid to having sufficient neutral details that will, invariably, be left in the shade. This type of lighting is also known as Rembrandtian light.

There are various technical challenges depending on the subject, what the photographer wants to highlight, or how many subjects are in the frame. Therefore, photographing a single person and, for instance, if the photographer wants to highlight only half of the subject's face, a single light source placed laterally, at a certain distance and angle to the subject, and possibly a blend, will be usually used. Experimenting with different light intensities is performed until the desired effect is achieved. For photographing two people or a static scene, two or even three sources of light (one or two for contour, and a very low-intensity fill light) are usually used. The background is kept dark (ideally, fully black), as well as part of the face that will remain in the shade.

The relative power of the main and the fill lights, known as light ratio, can be measured using a light meter. The low-key technique has a higher light ratio, for example 8:1, while the high-key technique has a lower ratio, around 1:1. According to photographer Gavin Hoey "the first attention to detail has to be the background. It is best to keep it black or dark gray ... and from there, it is about improvising to achieve that perfect shot you have in mind" Lights Talking advises choosing and maintaining the lowest ISO (100, 64 or even 32) to get noise-free photographs.

=== Painting the human body in black ===
Unlike tattoo and other forms of body art, body painting is temporary, painted onto the human skin, and can last several hours or many weeks (in the case of mehndi or "henna tattoos" about two weeks).

Painting the human body in black is also employed in low-key photography using non-toxic dyes or pigments in order to darken and enhance as much as possible the colour of the subjects photographed, and to achieve the desired effects. In order to achieve the effect of reflection of light that creates a white contour of the painted body, as well as a high contrast between black and white, various dyes mixed with body creams are used. These usually include henna, tempera or acrylic paint. Liquid latex, which is composed of natural latex and dyes, is also used with caution to avoid stopping the skin to breathe.

Acrylic paint can be applied on the body with simple brushes or aerographs. This is one of the most used techniques because it dries very fast, provides elasticity and does not stain, since it is a water-soluble dye.

== Gallery ==
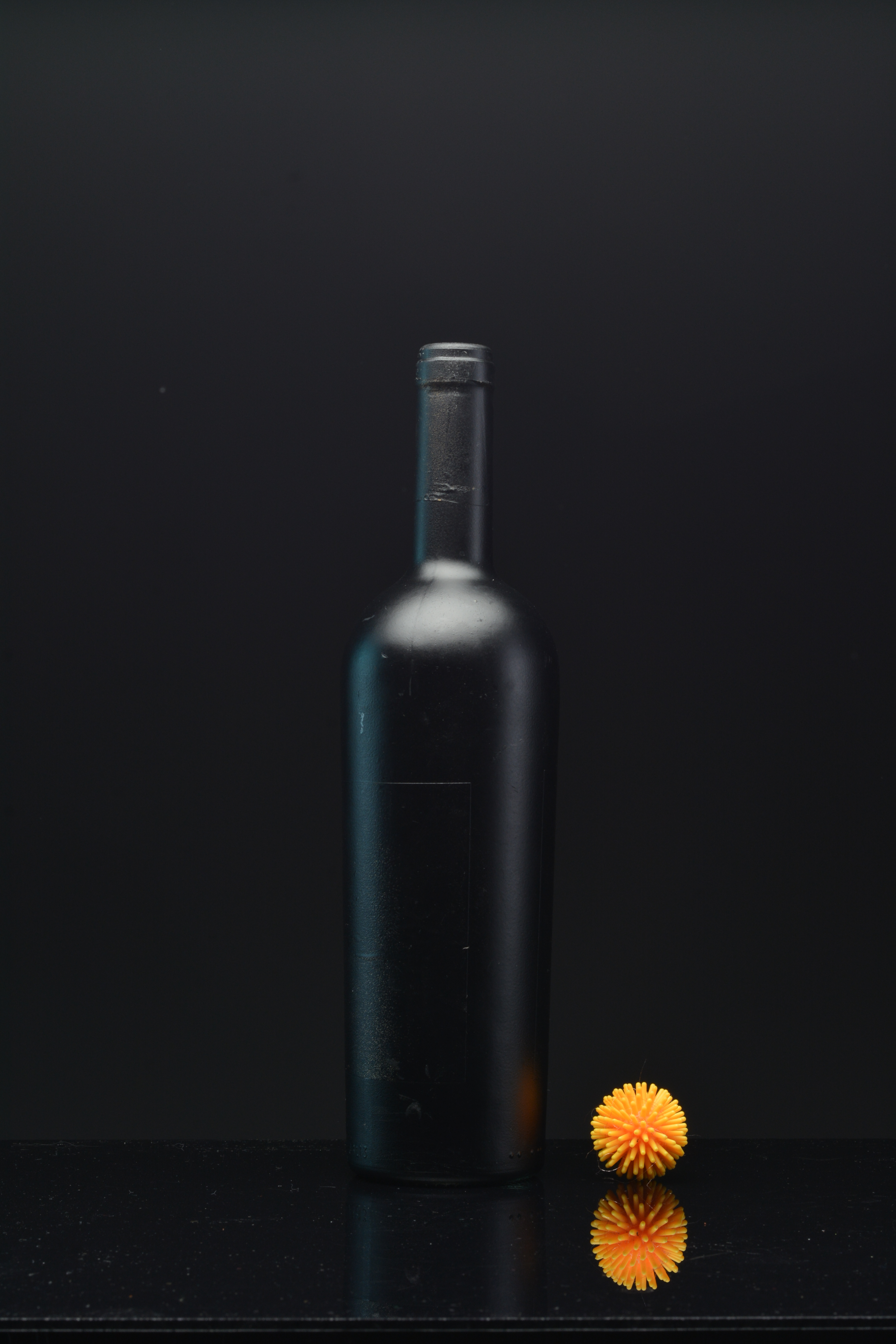
Basic low-key photograph created by using only one source of light

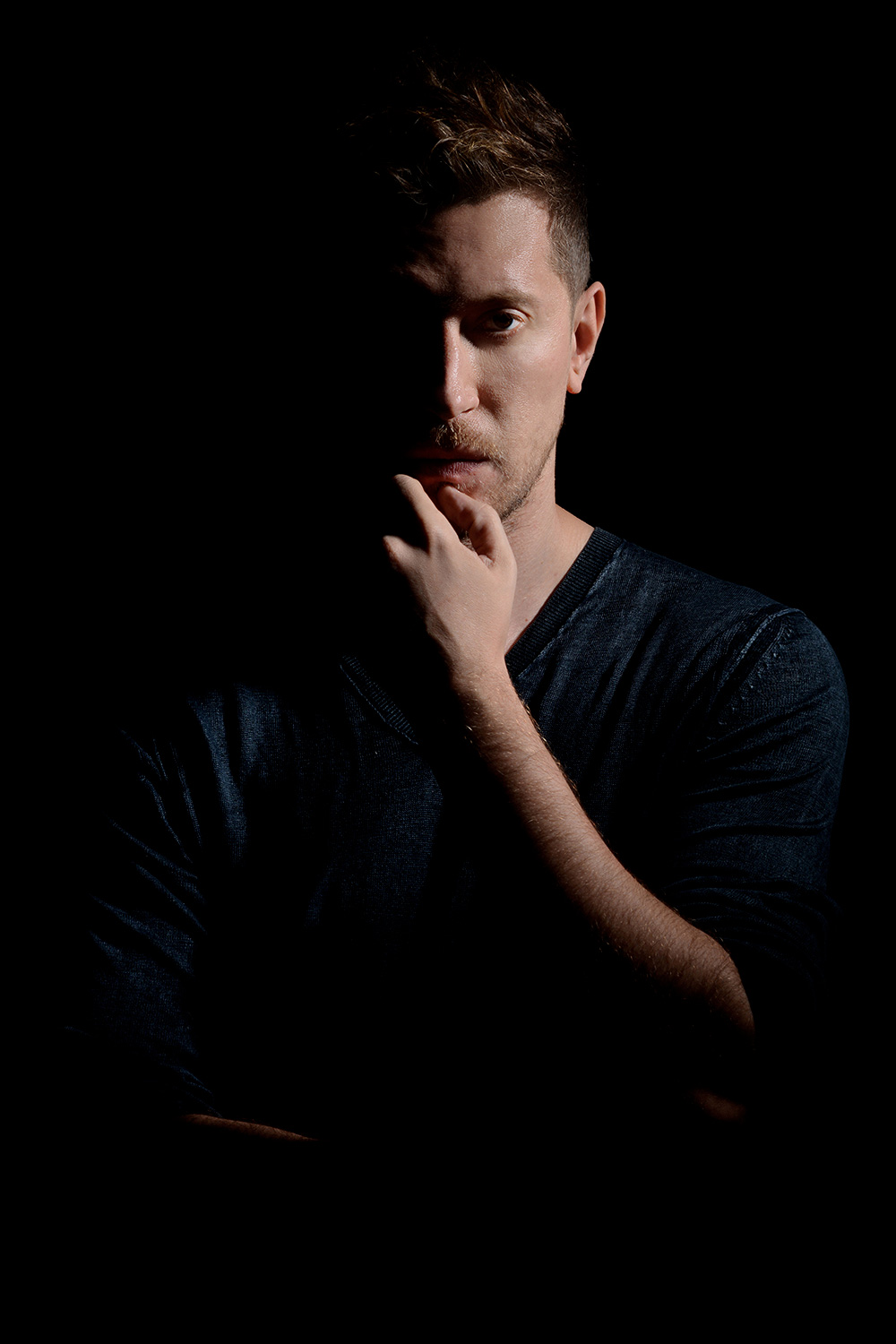
Low-key portrait using a single source of light

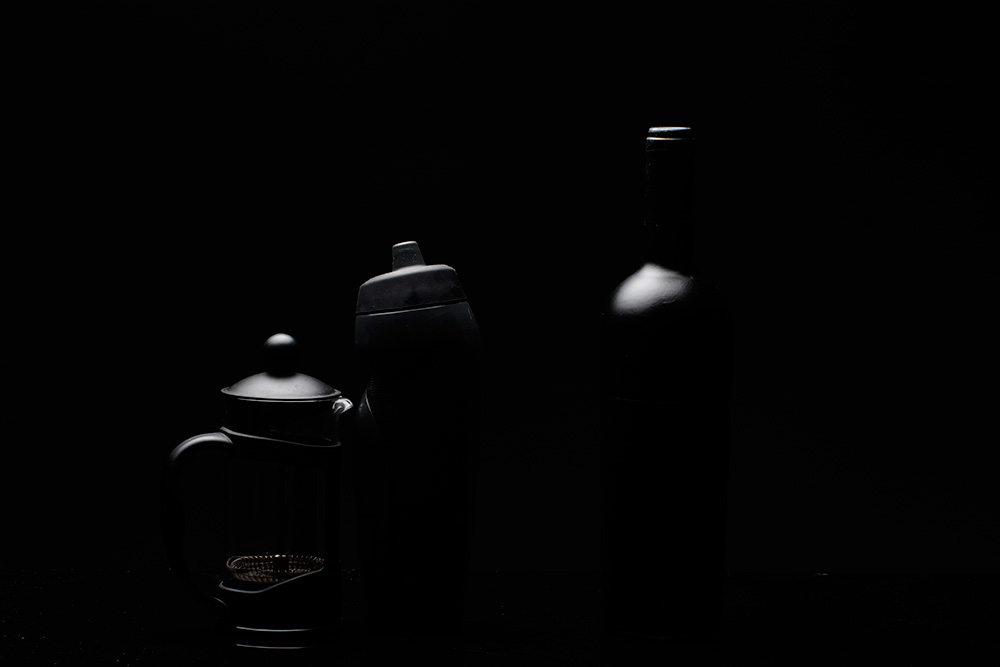
Low-key photograph created by using a single source of light

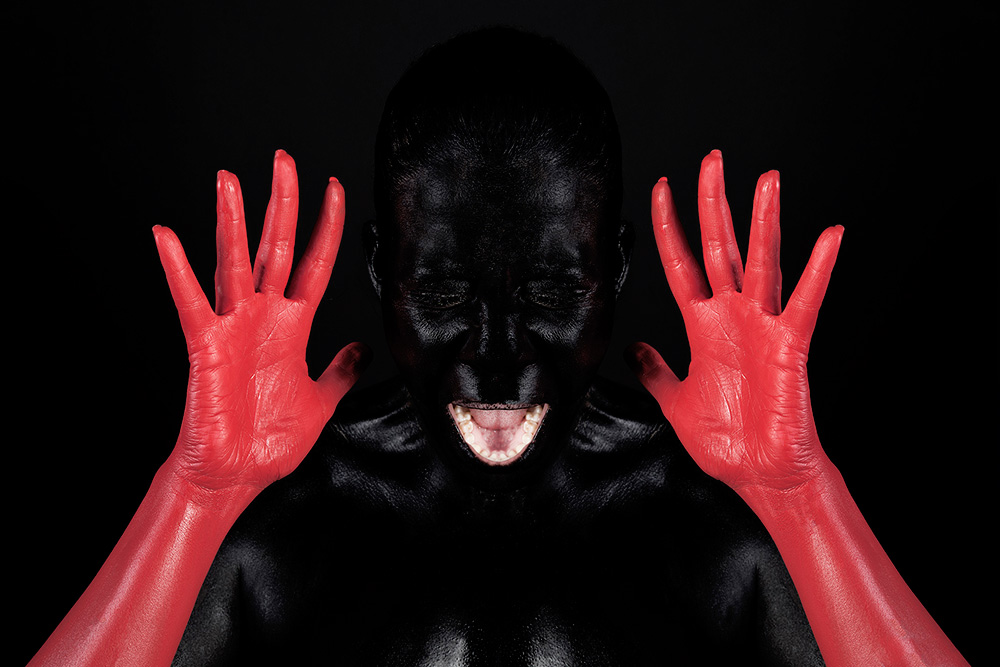
Low-key photograph combined mixed with red; two light sources

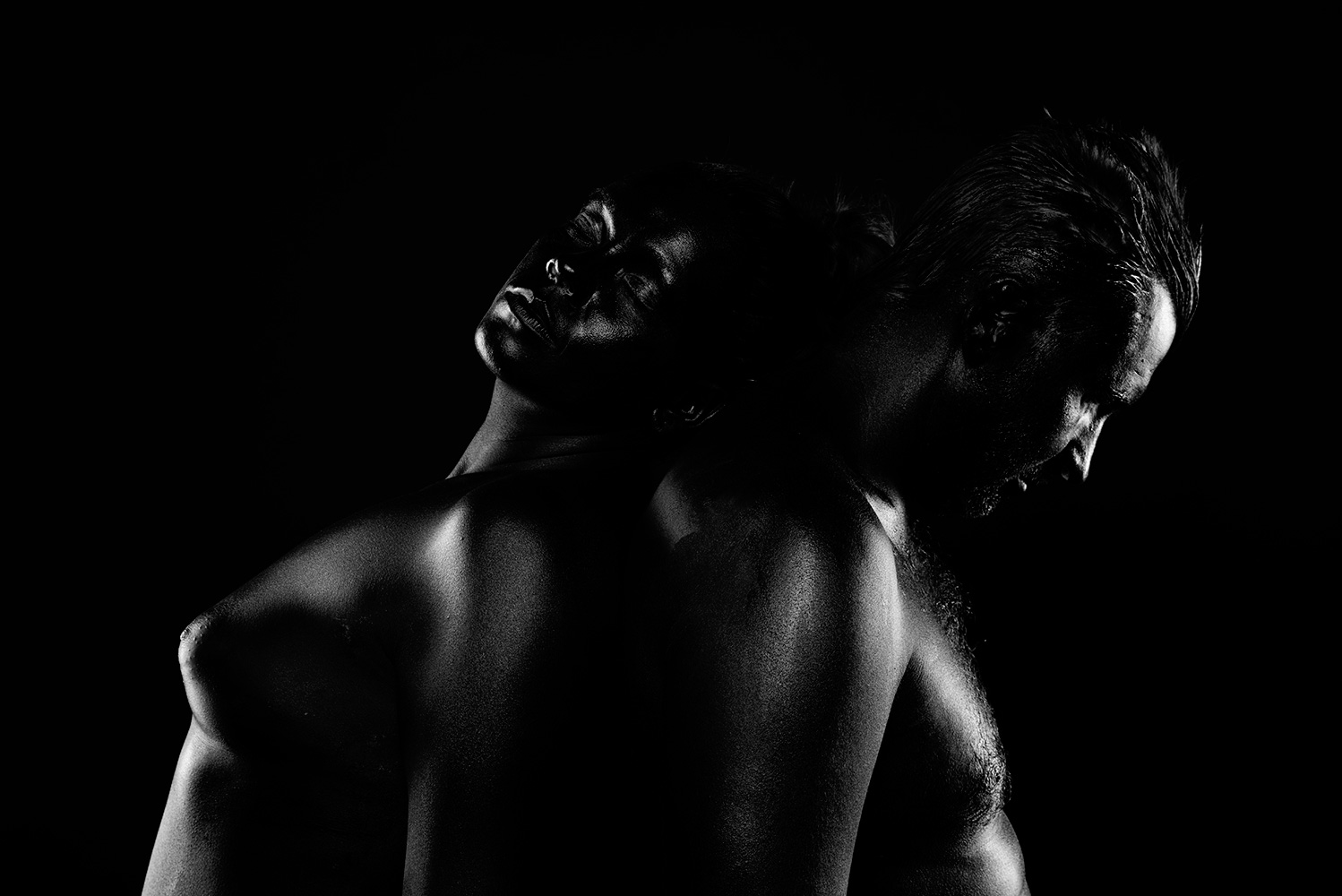
Low-key photograph using two light sources; painted bodies

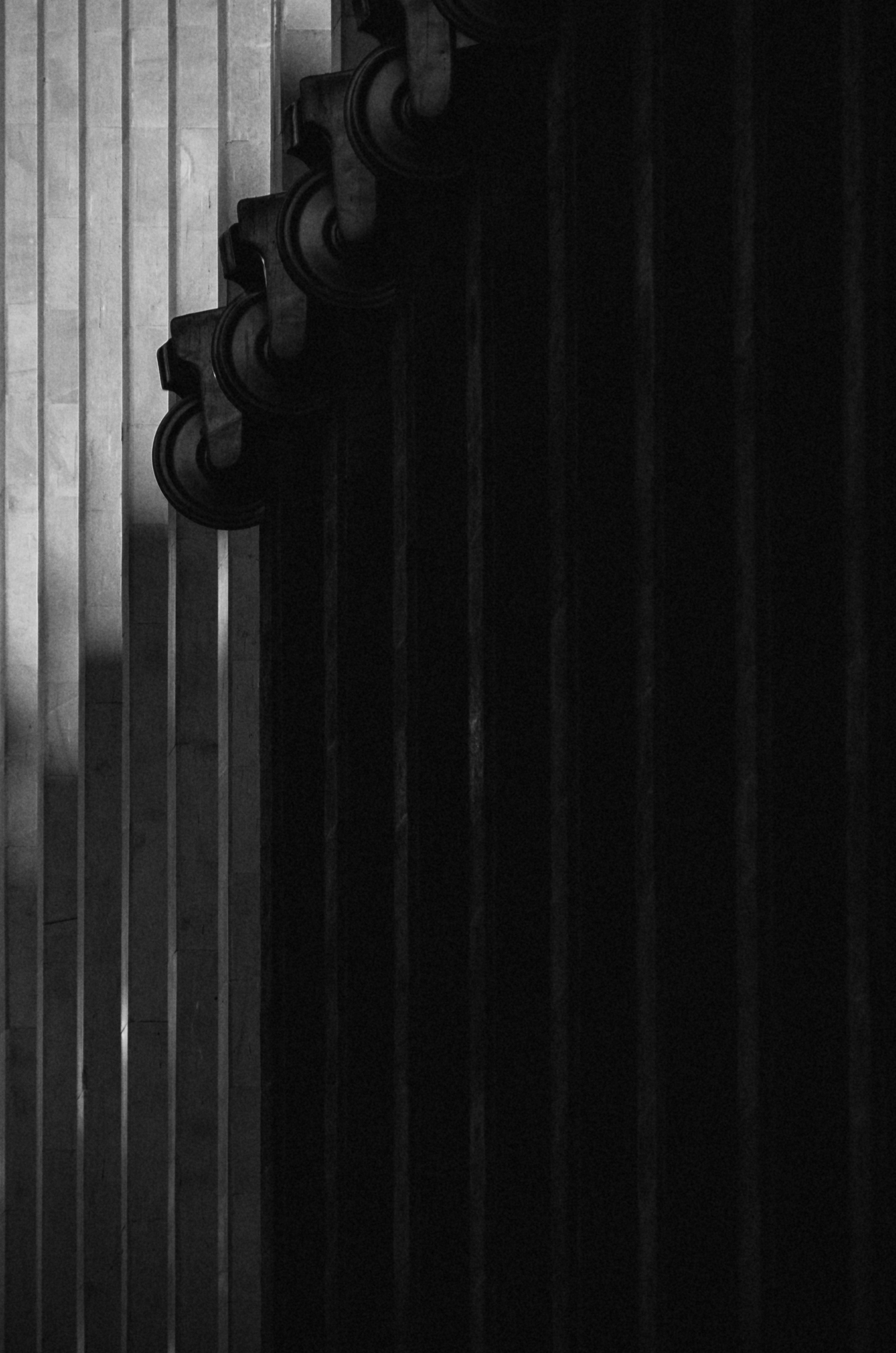
Low-key photograph created by using natural light

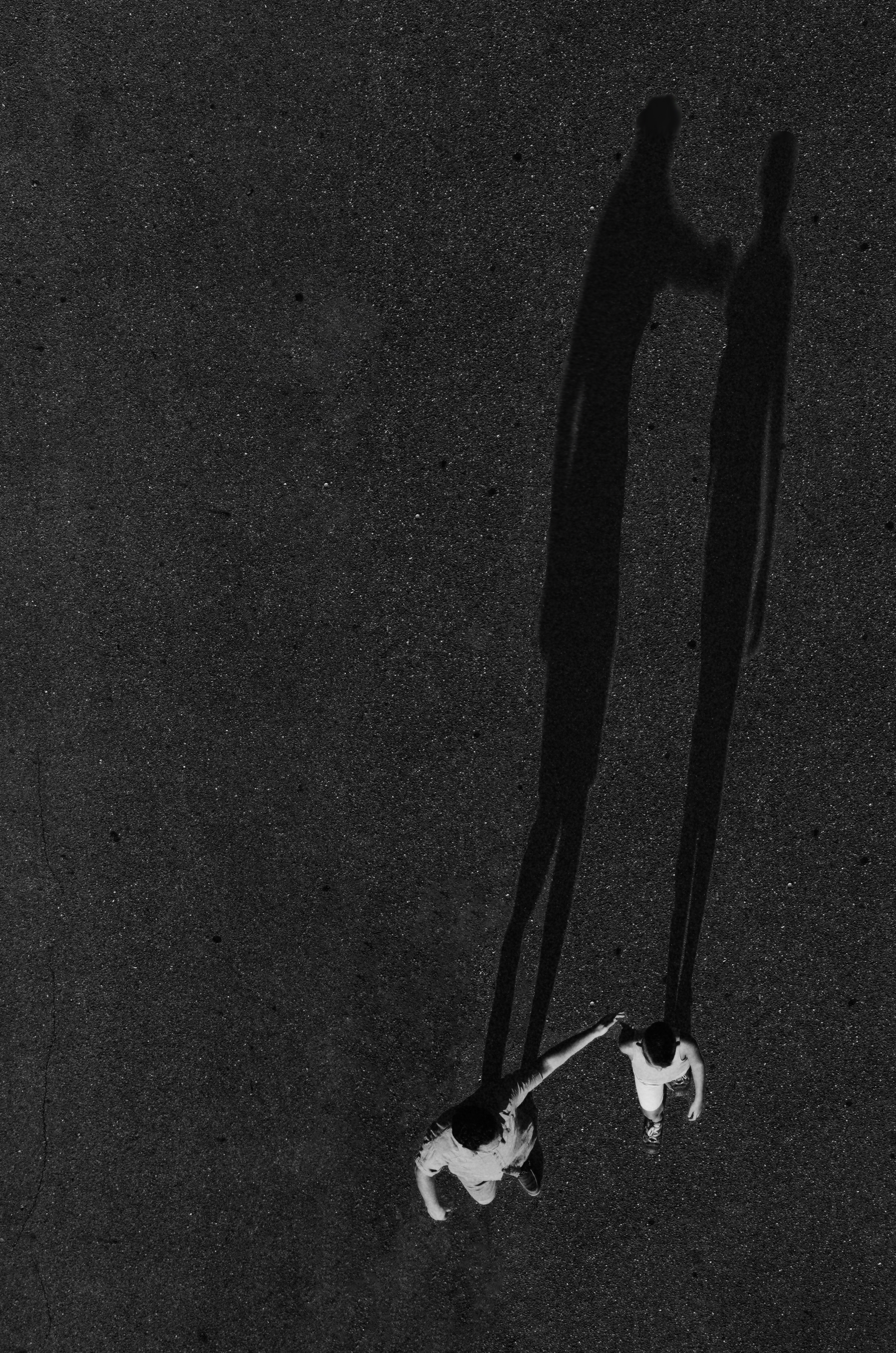
Low-key photograph created by using natural light

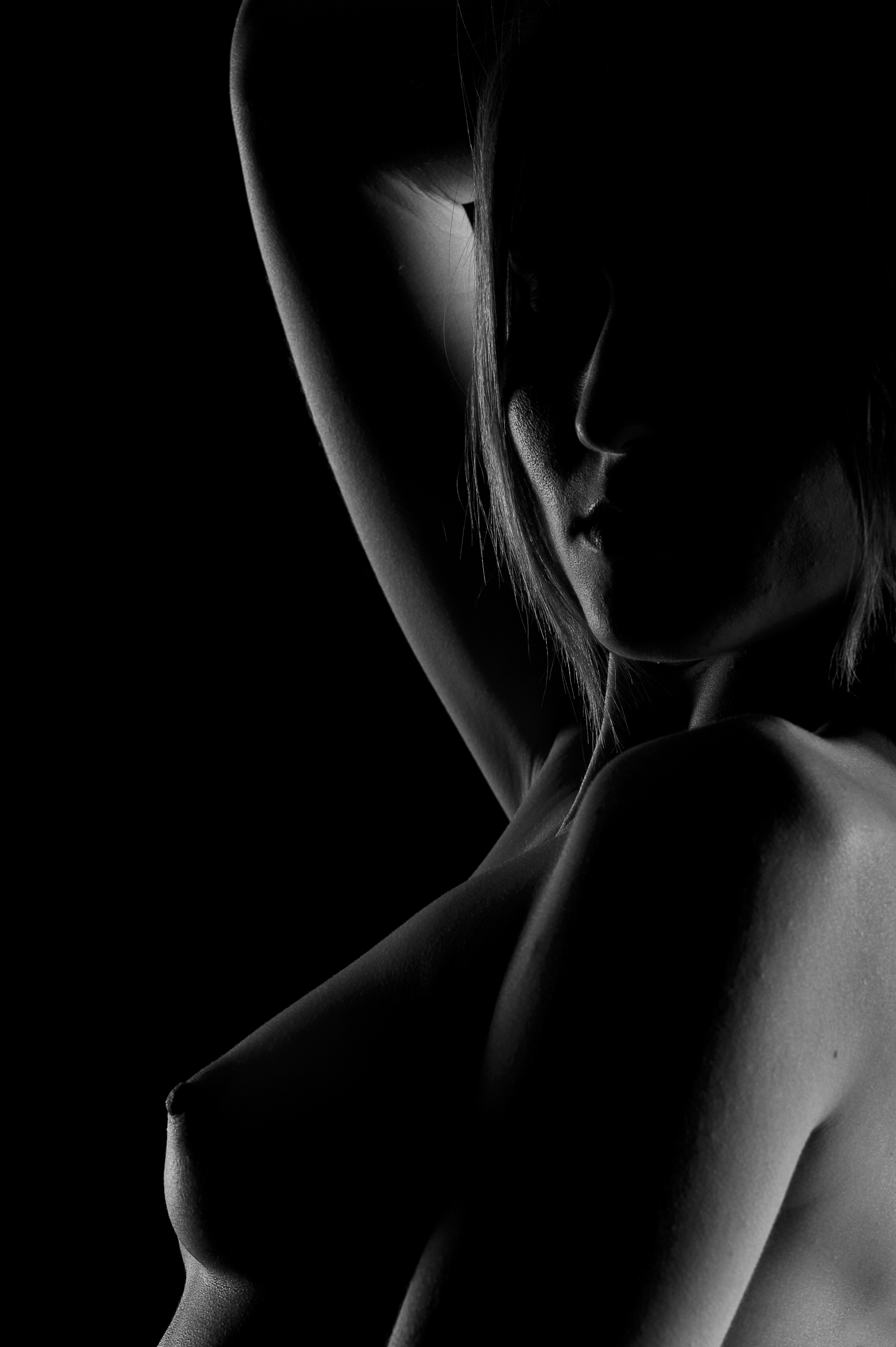
Low-key photograph

== See also ==
- Black light theatre
