= Top-left lighting =

Artistic convention

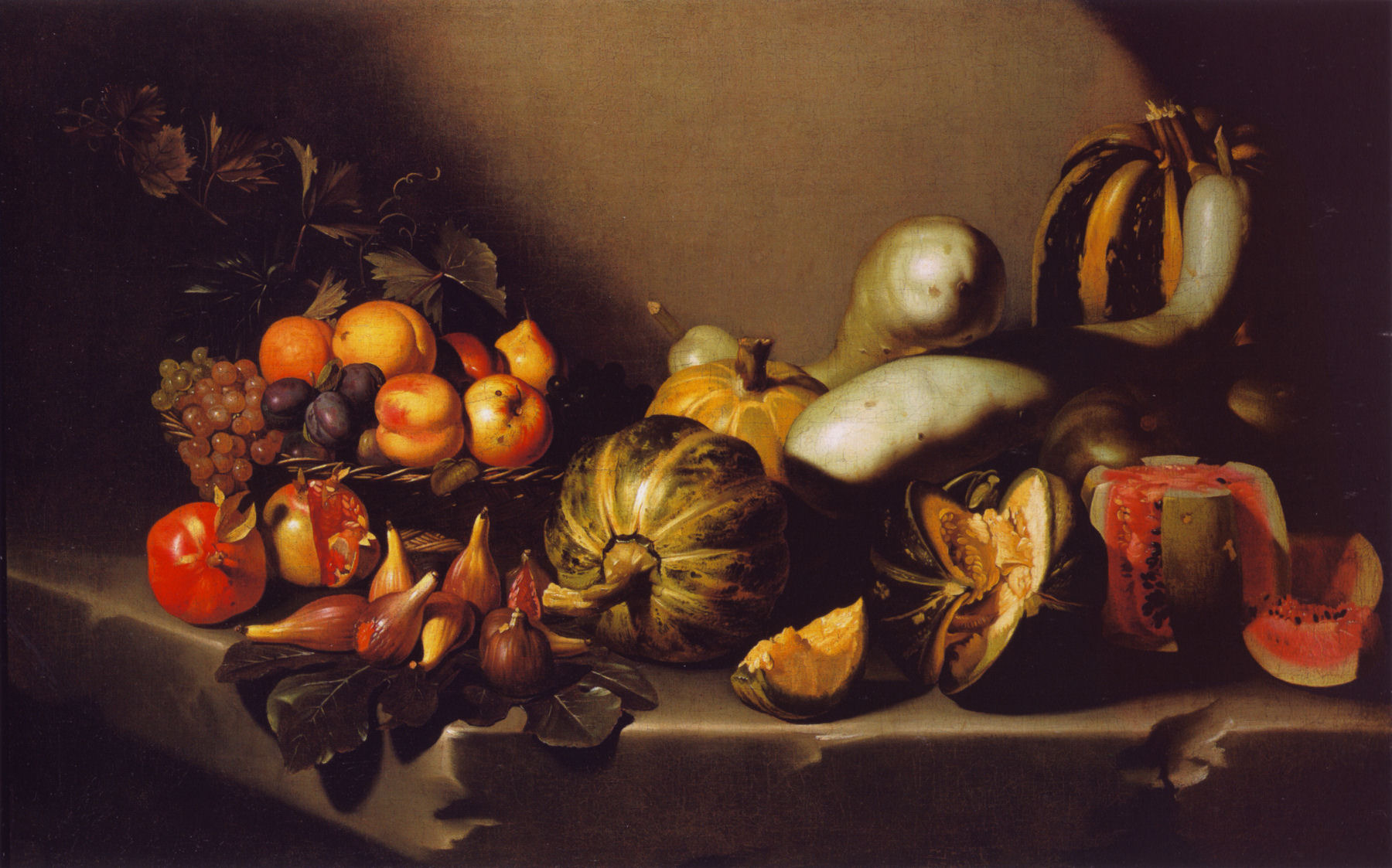
Still Life with Fruit by Caravaggio (1571–1610)

Hill profiles on a 1639 map of Hispaniola by Joan Vinckenboons

Top-left lighting is an artistic convention in which illustrations are produced so that the light appears to come from the top left of the picture.

The vertical element of the convention comes from the human intuition that sunlight comes from above. Most people prefer lighting from the left when resolving a convex–concave ambiguity, and this preference may be stronger for right-handed people. This is reflected in Roman mosaics and in Renaissance, baroque and impressionist art.

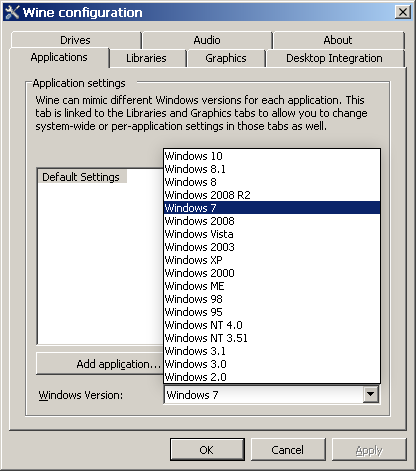
Top-left lighted UI elements in "classic" Windows applications, reproduced by winecfg.

In cartography, the predominant custom of placing the shadow on the right-hand side of hill profiles was established during the 15th century. Computer interfaces tend to use top left lighting as well (cf. Windows 9x and macOS screenshot), although this trend has gradually shifted more towards light coming straight from the top (cf. Android key light.)

There are notable exceptions to this convention, such as Sandro Botticelli's The Birth of Venus due to the point of view which may represent geographical perspective and location.

Viewing images that do not conform to this convention may show a form of convex–concave ambiguity.

== See also ==
- Key light
