= Lighting ratio =

Ratio in photography of key light to fill light

Lighting ratio in photography refers to the comparison of key light (the main source of light from which shadows fall) to the total fill light (the light that fills in the shadow areas). The higher the lighting ratio, the higher the contrast of the image; the lower the ratio, the lower the contrast. The lighting ratio is the ratio of the light levels on the brightest-lit to the least-lit parts of the subject; the brightest-lit areas are lit by both key (K) and fill (F). The American Society of Cinematographers (ASC) defines lighting ratio as (key+fill):fill, or (key+Σ_{fill}):Σ_{fill}, where Σ_{fill} is the sum of all fill lights.

Light can be measured in footcandles. A key light of 200 footcandles and fill light of 100 footcandles have a 3:1 ratio (a ratio of three to one) — (200 + 100):100.

A key light of 800 footcandles and a fill light of 200 footcandles has a ratio of 5:1 according to the lighting ratio formula — (800 + 200):200 = 1000 / 200 = 5 : 1.

The ratio can be determined in relation to F stops, comparing the light on the brightly lit side of the subject with the light on the shadow side, since each increase in f-stop is equal to double the amount of light: 2 to the power of the difference in f stops is equal to the first factor in the ratio. For example, a difference of two f-stops is 2 squared, or a 4:1 ratio. A difference in 3 stops is 2 cubed, or an 8:1 ratio. No difference is equal to 2 to the power of 0, for a 1:1 ratio.

Two ways of calculating the ratio are in use. In the source method, the key and fill lights are measured independently and compared with each other. In the additive method, the combined light of key and fill on the brightly lit side of the subject is compared with the fill light alone on the shadow side. With a key light one stop brighter than the fill, for example, the intensity ratio of the two lights is 2:1, but the additive lighting ratio is 3:1, because the fill also falls on the key-lit side. Many portrait and commercial photographers standardize on one of the two methods.

== See also ==
- High-key lighting
- Low-key lighting
- Silhouette
