= High-key lighting =

Type of lighting style in media

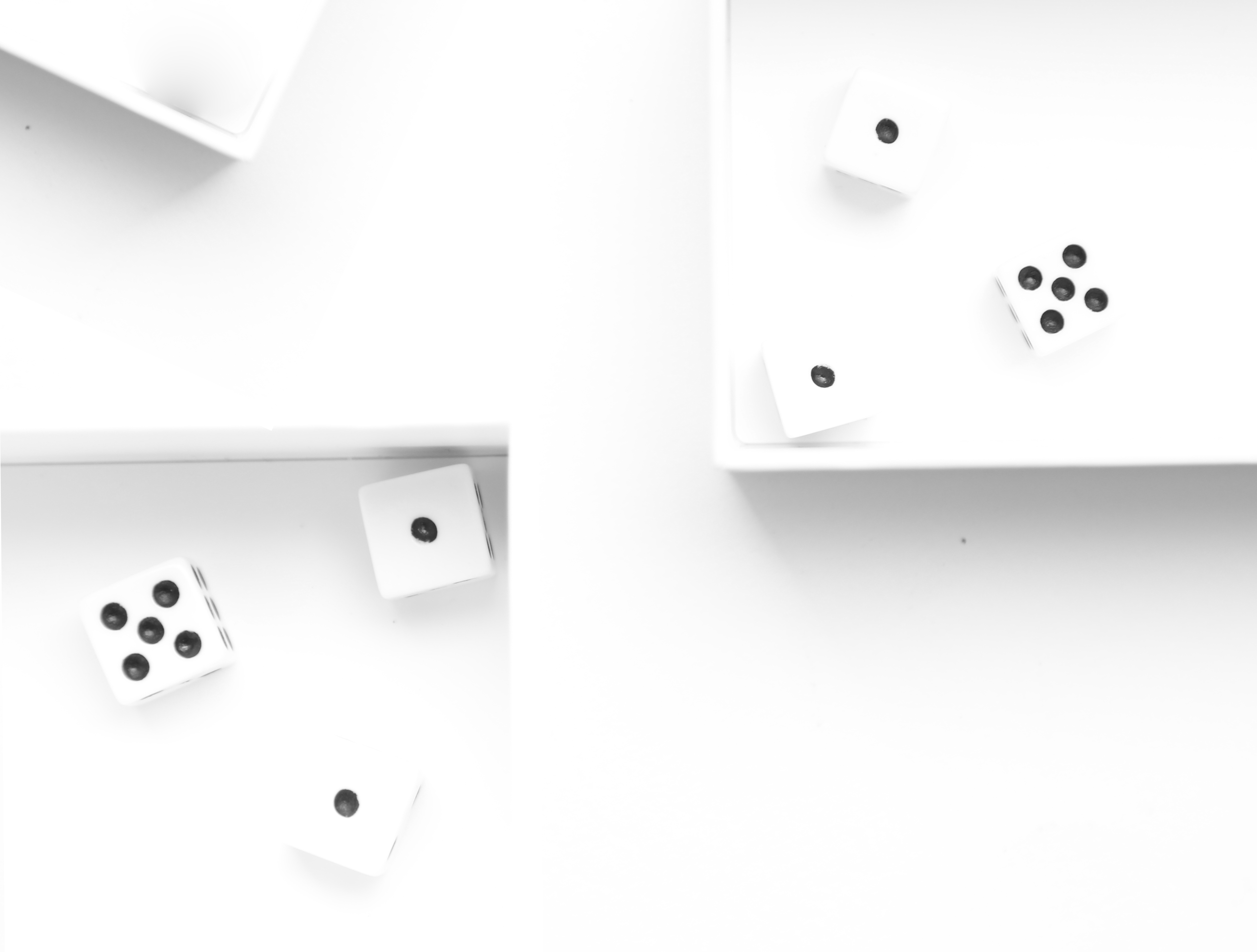
Example of a high-key photographic composition

High-key lighting is a style of lighting for film, television, or photography that aims to reduce the lighting ratio present in the scene. This was originally done partly for technological reasons, since early film and television did not deal well with high contrast ratios, but now is used to suggest an upbeat mood. It is often used in works of comedy. Outside film and television, it is common in commercials for food and beauty products, and in interviews and training videos, where its bright look can suggest truth and openness. High-key lighting is usually quite homogeneous and free from dark shadows. The terminology comes from the higher balance in the ratio between the key light and the fill light in a traditional three-point lighting setup.

In the 1950s and 1960s, high-key lighting was achieved through multiple light sources lighting a scene—usually using three fixtures per person (left, right, and central)—which resulted in a uniform lighting pattern with very little modeling. Nowadays, multiple hot light sources are replaced with much more efficient fluorescent or LED soft lights, which provide a similar effect.

The advantage of high-key lighting is that it doesn't require adjustment for each scene which allows the production to complete the shooting in hours instead of days. The primary drawback is that high-key lighting fails to add meaning or drama by lighting certain parts more prominently than others.

Shows with bigger budgets have moved away from high-key lighting by using lighting set-ups different from the three-point standard. Part of the reason for this is the advent of new lighting fixtures that are easier to use and quicker to set up. Another reason is the growing sophistication of the audience for TV programs and the need to differentiate.

== Movies ==
High-key lighting found its use in classical Hollywood cinema because it was well suited for three-point lighting and other filmmaking traditions. It is an overall lighting design which uses the fill light and backlight to create low contrast between brighter and darker areas. It can be used for both daylight and night scenes.

== See also ==
- Low-key lighting
