= Fill flash =

Photographic technique

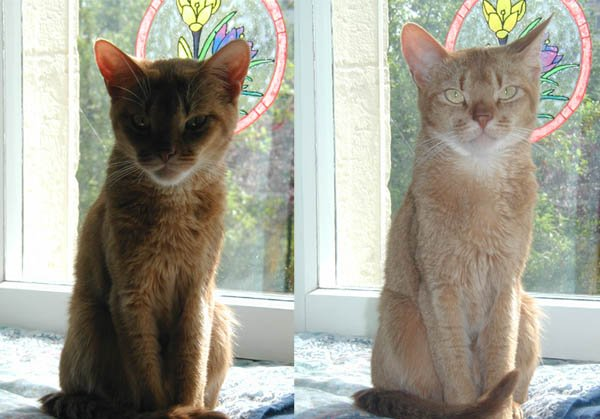
Left: without flash. Right: with fill flash

Fill flash is a photographic technique used to brighten deep shadow areas, typically outdoors on sunny days, though the technique is useful any time the background is significantly brighter than the subject of the photograph, particularly in backlit subjects. To use fill flash, the aperture and shutter speed are adjusted to correctly expose the background, and the flash is fired to lighten the foreground.

Most point and shoot cameras include a fill flash mode that forces the flash to fire, even in bright light.

Depending on the distance to the subject, using the full power of the flash may greatly overexpose the subject especially at close range. Certain cameras allow the level of flash to be manually adjusted e.g. 1/3, 1/2, or 1/8 power, so that both the foreground and background are correctly exposed, or allow an automatic flash exposure compensation.

== Pros and cons of near-axis fill flash ==
The advantage of using a fill flash located near the lens axis is "normalizing" exposure in situations like backlighting which exceed the ability of the camera to handle the contrast of the lighting. The disadvantage is the same one seen in indoor near-axis flash shots; a lack of directional modeling clues. Near-axis flash indoors and outdoors looks unnatural because natural light comes from overhead putting specular highlights higher on round surfaces like cheeks and creating downward and sideways shadow clues which, combined, help the brain interpret the 3D shape of objects in 2D photographs.

More natural-looking single flash results can be obtained by raising the flash vertically to create a more natural downward angle, but keeping it centered. This is usually preferable when photographing people because it hides most of the shadows, especially the very distracting nose shadow. In this case, the shadow is mostly hidden down below the nose and not noticed. The reason for not moving a single flash off-axis sideways rather than vertically is that any shadows the flash creates will be unfilled, dark, and potentially unflattering if poorly placed on a subject's face.

Bouncing a flash from a surface above the subject, such as a ceiling, creates the same downward modeling direction but is not a strategy that can be used outdoors. When the flash is moved off-axis or bounced to create directional modeling its role changes from "fill" to that of "key" light.

== Overlapping flash on sunlit faces ==
Faces oriented towards the sun at midday will usually have dark shadows in the eye sockets due to the steep downward angle of the sun and the preference of the subjects not to be blinded by the sun. When near-axis fill flash is added in that situation it hits the shaded eyes and sunlit face equally so the eyes will always remain darker than the face. What happens on a cause-and-effect level is the flash acts like fill and more key light where it overlaps. The eyes will seem brighter due to the addition of catchlight reflections from the flash but they will still look dull and lifeless.

So while near-axis fill works in the technical sense and works fine for general candid shooting it is not the ideal strategy for a close-up portrait where the eyes are a more critical focal point. The more ideal strategy for portraits is open shade or backlit which allows the subject to raise their face and eyes into the skylight without squinting.

== Flash could make the shadows darker ==
In sunny backlight, the problem is more contrast than the camera can handle. But on an overcast day, the problem is a lack of contrast. In overcast conditions adding flash will have the net effect of making the shadows darker. Even if the flash is near-axis fill flash it will fall off front-to-back more rapidly than the natural lighting and increase contrast. If moved off axis the flash becomes a "key" light and can be used to create a higher contrast directional lighting pattern on the face. The greater the amount of off-axis flash added, the darker the shadows will become after exposure is adjusted for normal-looking highlights.

== See also ==
- Fill light
