= Key light =

First light in a photographic or filmmaking lighting scheme

A typical three-point setup with a shoulder or back-side lamp to create contrast between the background and center object so as to give a three-dimensional appearance

The key light is the first and usually most important light that a photographer, cinematographer, lighting camera operator, or other scene composer will use in a lighting setup. The purpose of the key light is to highlight the form and dimension of the subject. The key light is not a rigid requirement; omitting the key light can result in a silhouette effect. Many key lights may be placed in a scene to illuminate a moving subject at opportune moments.

== Position of camera ==
The key light can be "hard" (focused) or "soft" (diffused), and depending on the desired setup can be placed at different angles relative to the subject. When part of the most common setup—three-point lighting—the key light is placed at a 30–60° angle (with the camera marking 0°). In addition to the horizontal angle, the key light can be placed high or low, producing different effects. The most common vertical angle for the key light is 30° above eye level, so that the nose would not cast a shadow on the lips.

A key light positioned low appears to distort the actor's features, since most natural or ambient light is normally overhead. A dramatic effect used in horror or comedy cinematography is a key light illuminating the face from below. A high key light will result in more prominent cheek bones and long nose shadows. Marlene Dietrich was famous for insisting that her key light be placed high.

== Lighting a scene ==
Using just a key light results in a high-contrast scene, especially if the background is not illuminated. A fill light decreases contrast and adds more details to the dark areas of an image. An alternative to the fill light is to reflect existing light or to illuminate other objects in the scene, which in turn further illuminate the subject.

The key light does not have to directly illuminate the subject: it may pass through various filters, screens, or reflectors. Light passing through tree leaves, window panes, and other obstacles can make a scene more visually interesting, as well as cue the audience to the location of the subject. The key light also does not have to be white light—a colored key (especially when used with fill or back lighting of other colors) can add more emotional depth to a scene than white alone. In mixed indoor/outdoor daytime scenes, sunlight may appear to be a warm white, and indoor lighting to be a neutral or artificially-toned white. By contrast, moonlight appears to be cooler than indoor lighting.

== Lighting choices ==
In many cases, the key light is a stage light for indoor scenes, or sunlight for outdoors. A lighting instrument may also be used outdoors to supplement sunlight or as the primary light source with sunlight or skylight serving as fill lighting. Lamps and light fixtures that are visible props on the set (called "practicals") can serve as key lights if they are of sufficient brightness. Similarly, fire, candles and other natural sources of light can be used.

== See also ==
- High-key lighting
- Low-key lighting
- Low-key photography
- Stage lighting instrument
- McCandless method
- Top-left lighting
