= Sony Ericsson Xperia Acro =

Android smartphone by Sony Ericsson

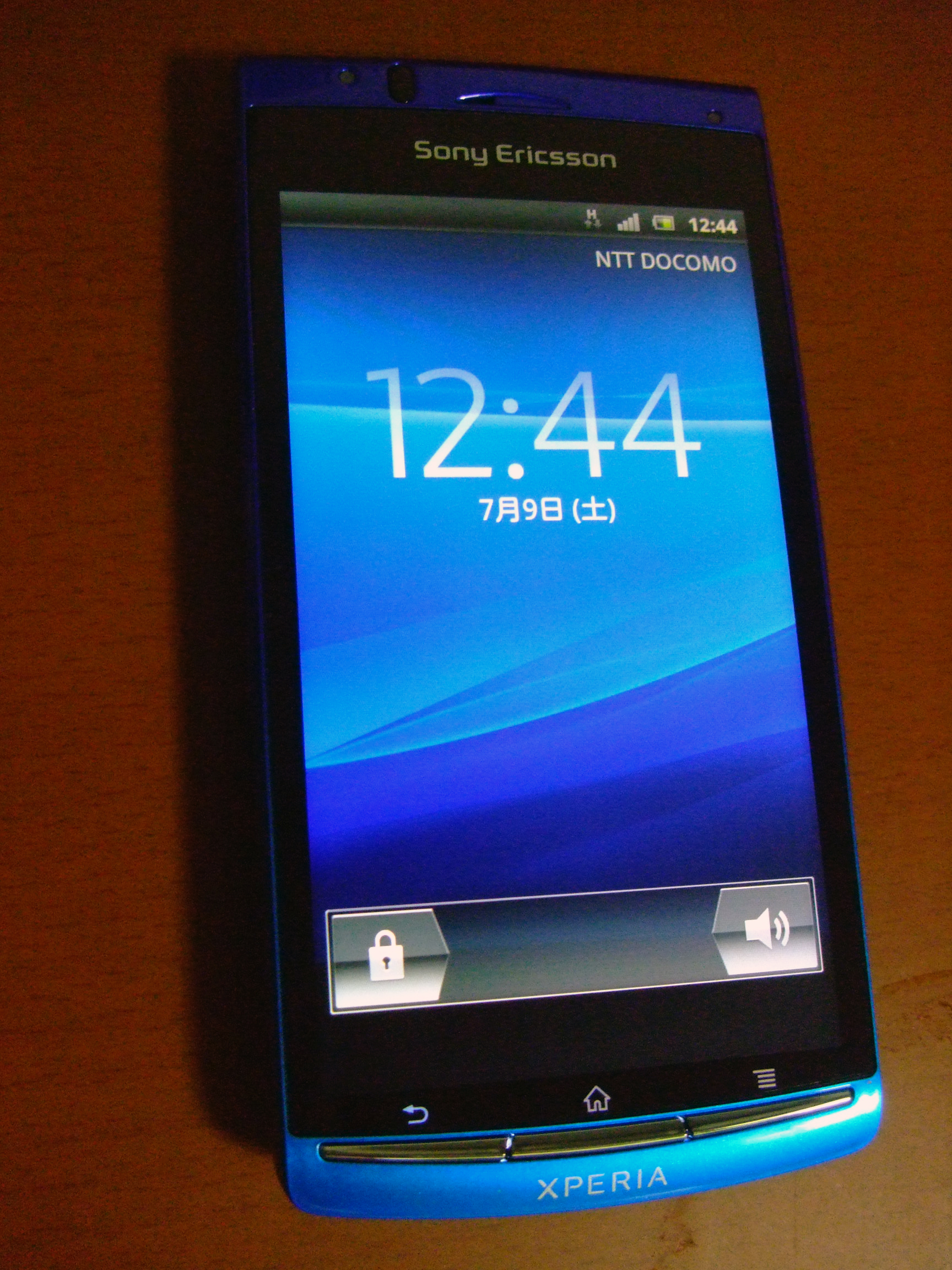
- Xperia acro SO-02C (NTT docomo)
- Manufacturer: Sony Ericsson
- Series: Sony Ericsson Xperia
- Availability by region: July 2011 / June 2011
- Related: Sony Ericsson Xperia Arc S Sony Ericsson Xperia Arc
- Form factor: Slate smartphone (Black, White, Aqua (SO-02C only) and Ruby (IS11S only))
- Dimensions: 127×63×11.8 mm (5.00×2.48×0.46 in)
- Weight: 135 g (5 oz)
- Operating system: Android 2.3.3 "Gingerbread"
- CPU: Qualcomm MSM8255 1 GHz Scorpion (Snapdragon) Adreno 205 GPU (SO-02C); Qualcomm MSM8655 1 GHz Scorpion (Snapdragon) Adreno 205 GPU (IS11S)
- Memory: 512 MB
- Storage: Up to 32 GB on microSD memory card
- Battery: Li-Po 1500 mAh
- Rear camera: 8.1 MP (3264×2448), Back-illuminated sensor Exmor R CMOS Sensor, Auto Focus, Face recognition, Geo-tagging, Image and video stabilizer, Smile detection, Touch focus, Video 720p HD (Android 2.3)
- Display: 4.2 inch 854×480 px FWVGA "Reality Display" TFT LCD at 233 PPI with Mobile BRAVIA Engine, 16M Colors
- Connectivity: Bluetooth 2.1 with A2DP microUSB 2.0; 3.5 mm audio jack aGPS; Wi-Fi 802.11 b/g/n HDMI
- Data inputs: Multi-touch capacitive touchscreen, Accelerometer

The Sony Ericsson Xperia Acro is an Android-based smartphone produced by Sony Ericsson Mobile Communications in Japan. The device has several additional functions for Japan customers from Xperia Arc. It was launched on 24 June 2011.

This model is the last Sony Ericsson branded phone to be released in Japan, while Xperia Arc S is the last internationally.

Sony Mobile Communications (formerly Sony Ericsson Mobile Communications) released the Sony Ericsson Xperia acro HD as succeeding model of Xperia acro.

== Basics ==
The Xperia Acro is supplied by "NTT DoCoMo" and "au by KDDI" which are Japanese mobile phone operators. Each operators' devices are called Xperia acro SO-02C (NTT docomo) and Xperia acro IS11S (au).

Each mobile phone operators adopt different communication interfaces. The "Xperia acro IS11S" supported CDMA2000 with Japanese Xperia product first.

The Xperia Acro is available in a choice of either Black, White, Aqua (SO-02C only), or Ruby (IS11S only).

=== Specs ===
- OS – Android 2.3.3 (Gingerbread); no official support to upgrade to Android 4.0; custom ROM's available
- CPU – 1 GHz Qualcomm Snapdragon processor
- RAM – 512 MB
- SDHC – 32 GB microSDHC (expandable up to 32 GB)
- Display – 854×480 pixels, 4.2-inch Reality display, Sony Mobile BRAVIA Engine
- Image sensor – 8.1 mega-pixel camera (Exmor R)
- Image output – HDMI-out

=== Added functions for Japan ===
- FeliCa(NFC) – used for Wallet Mobile in Japan
- IrDA – used for the exchange of the address book with the existing Japanese cell-phone. (Refer to 'Feature phone', 'Mobile phone industry in Japan')
- 1seg – is a mobile terrestrial digital audio/video and data broadcasting service in Japan.

=== Gallery ===
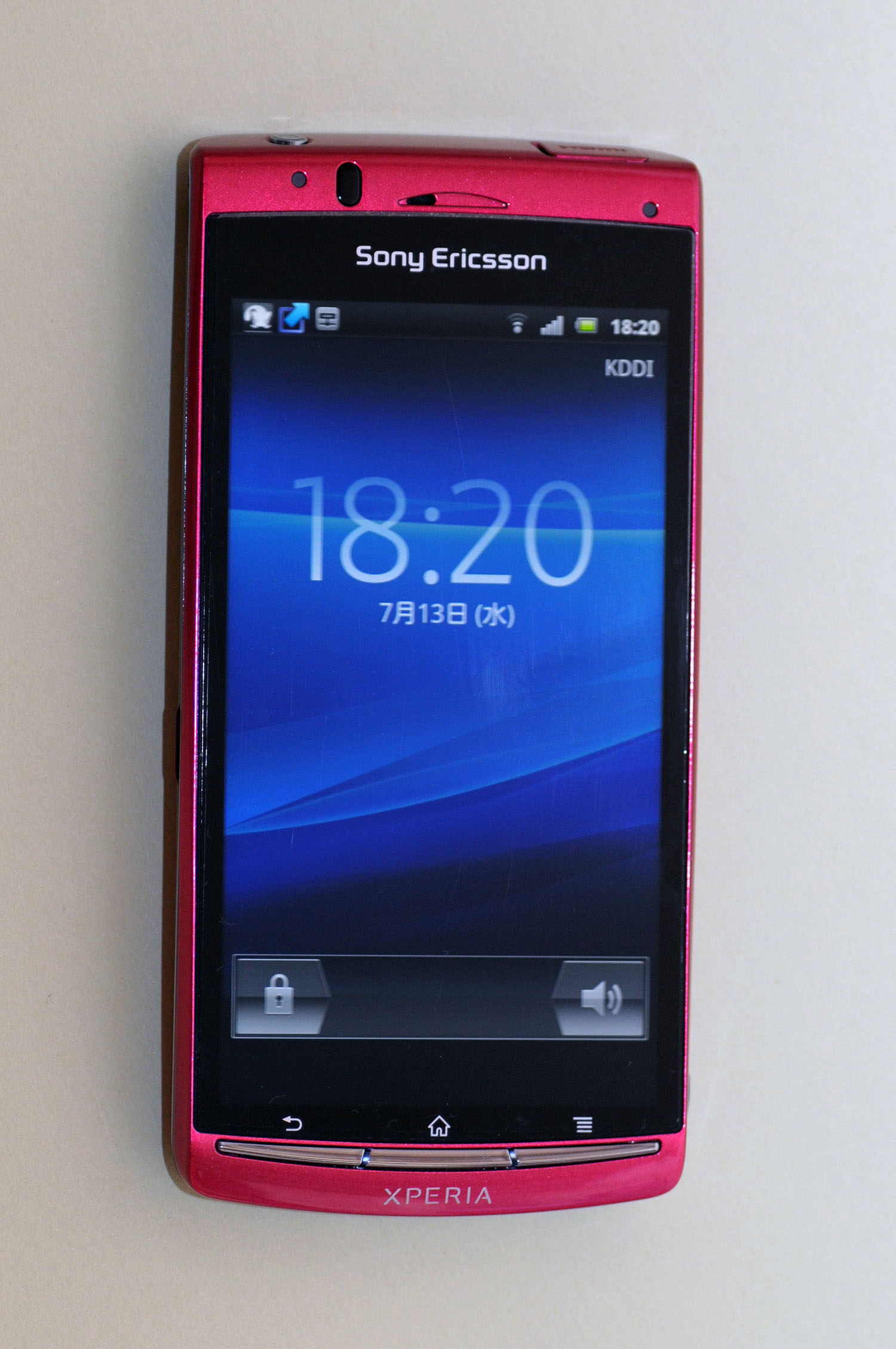
Xperia acro IS11S (au by KDDI)

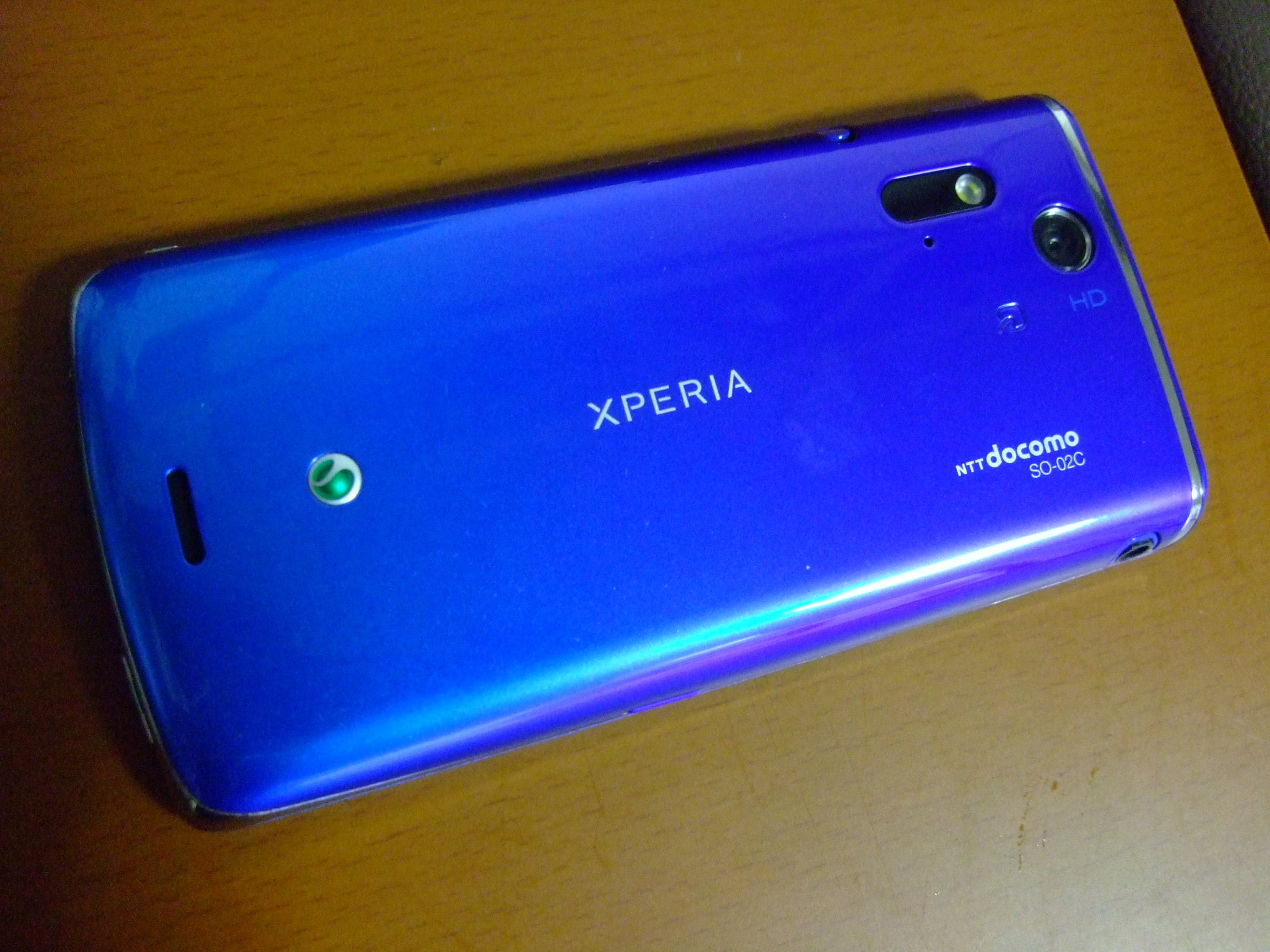
SO-02C REAR.

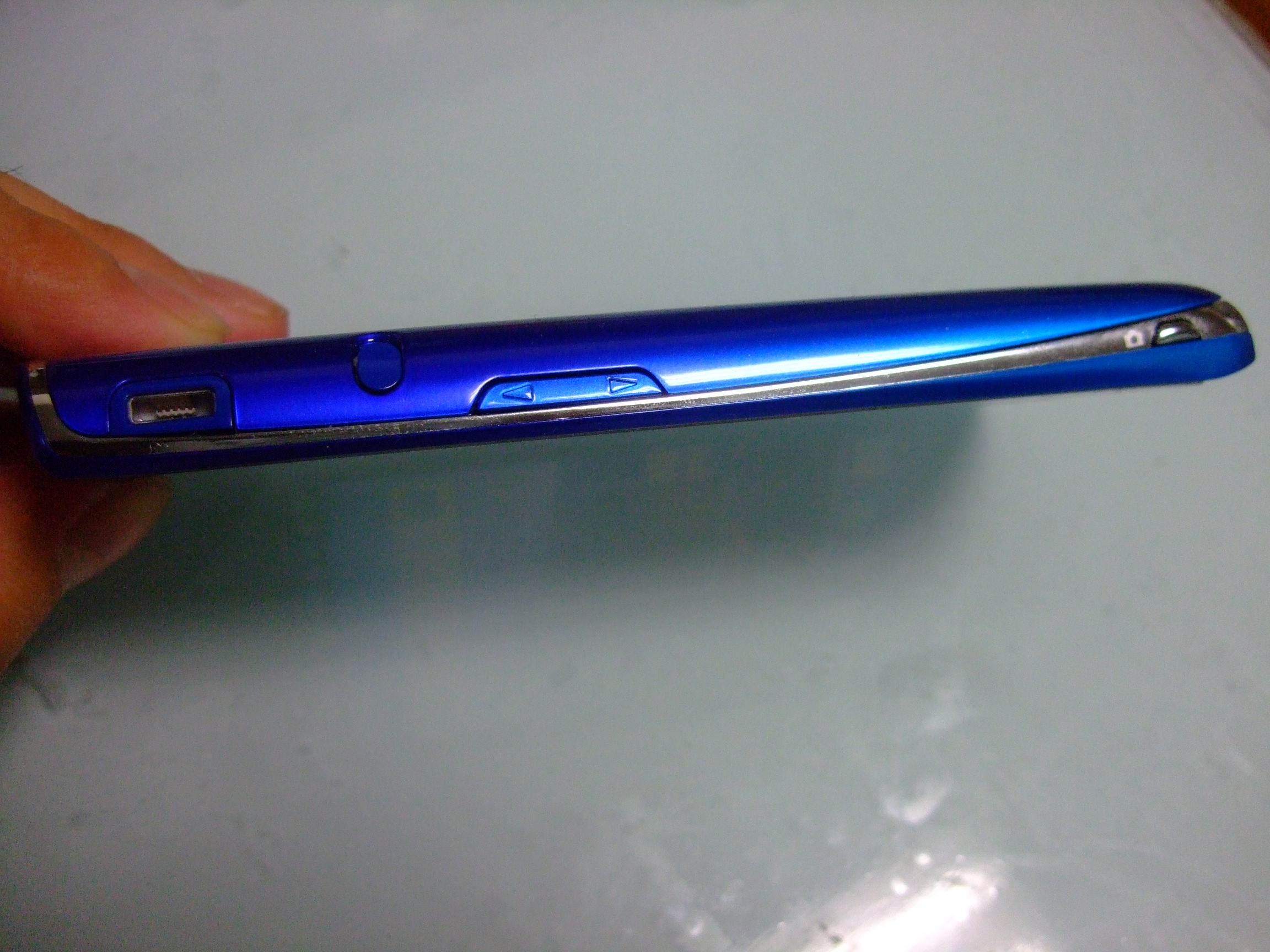
SO-02C Side.

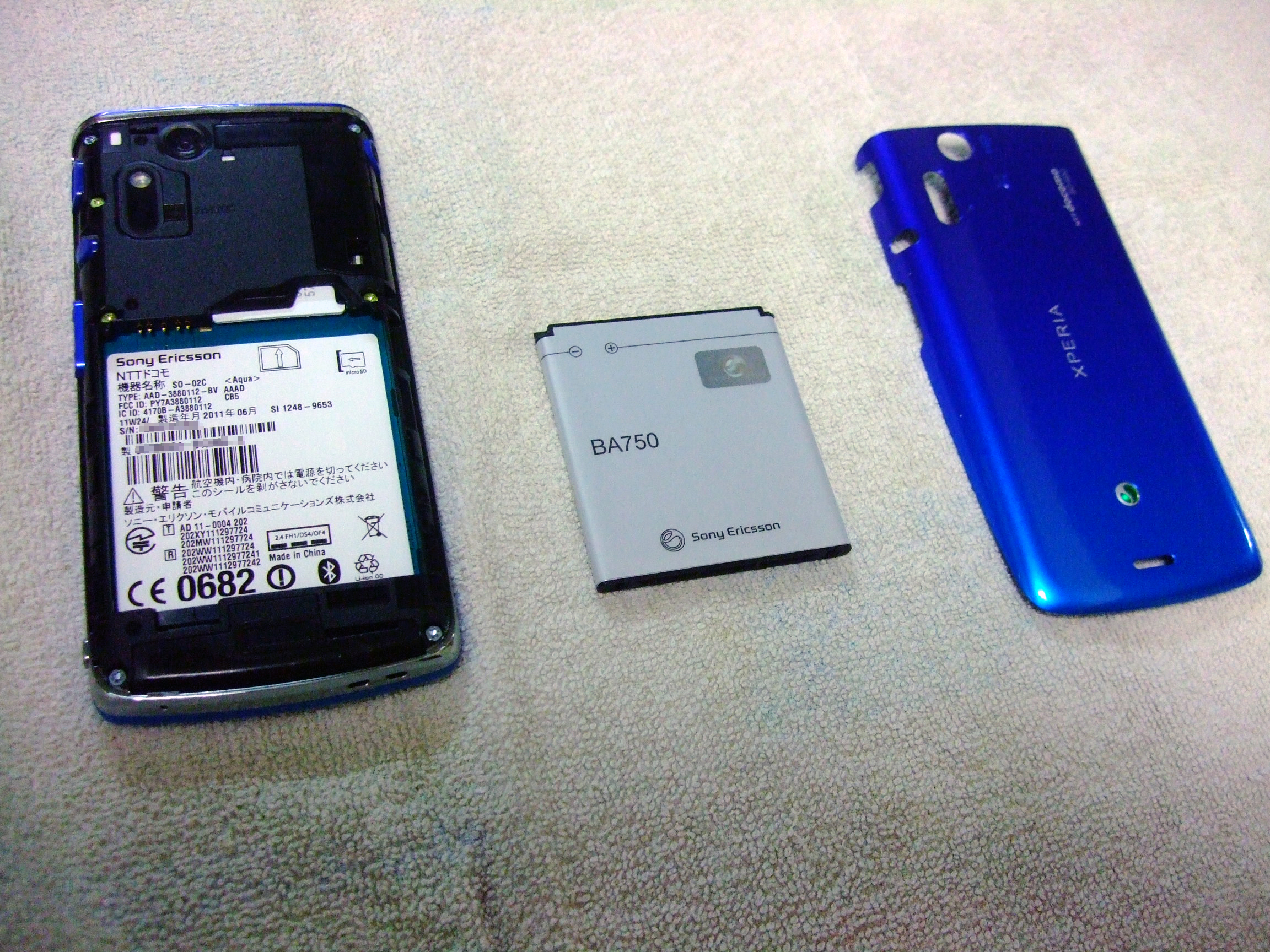
SO-02C Remove Rear.

== See also ==
- List of Xperia devices
- Xperia Arc
- Xperia acro S
- ja:SO-02C
- ja:IS11S
