= Japanese telephone carriers =

Japanese telephone carriers may refer to:

- Communications in Japan § Telephone services
- Mobile phone industry in Japan § Providers
- List of telecommunications companies § Japan
- List of mobile network operators of the Asia Pacific region § Japan

== See also ==
- Telephone numbers in Japan
