= BIVL =

BIVL is a proprietary video on demand (VDM) technology by Sony corporation. BIVL stands for BRAVIA Internet Video Link.

BIVL consists of an internet video service that is accessed via a hardware peripheral that can only be added to compatible Sony BRAVIA TV sets.

== History ==
BIVL was launched in February 2007, and shipped in July 2007 to retail. At launch, BIVL took the form of a small module that is attached to the back of a compatible BRAVIA TV. The module originally retailed for around $300, and fell to around $200 about a year later. When attached to a compatible Sony television, the module enabled access to Internet video programming, including high-definition content, from providers like AOL, Yahoo! and Grouper, as well as Sony Pictures Entertainment and Sony BMG Music. In mid-2008, Sony announced the addition of Amazon Video on Demand to the service, and in July 2009, Sony announced the addition of the Netflix service.

== Public Reaction ==
Initial reviews of the BIVL service were mixed. While the BIVL device and service offers an easy way to access video on select Sony TVs, much of the content is already freely available and also available via other devices that had superior UIs and offered better performance.
