= Sony Ericsson Xperia Arc =

Smartphone by Sony Ericsson

Sony Ericsson Xperia Arc (X12)
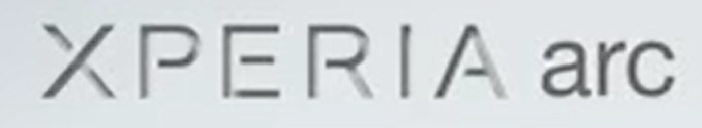

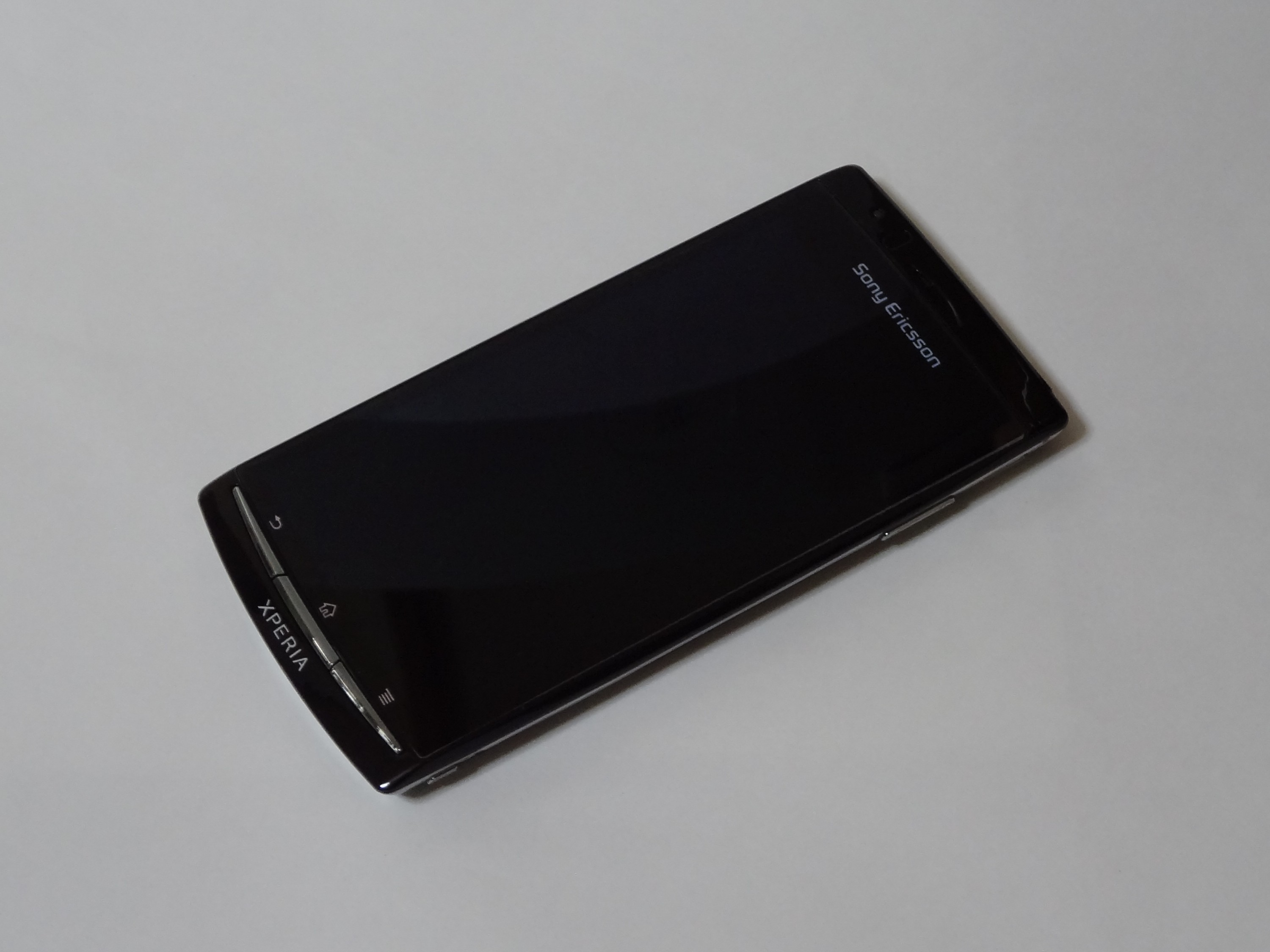
- Manufacturer: Sony Ericsson
- Series: Sony Ericsson Xperia
- First released: 24 March 2011; 15 years ago
- Availability by region: UK: April 2011
- Predecessor: Sony Ericsson Xperia X10
- Successor: Sony Ericsson Xperia arc S
- Form factor: Slate smartphone
- Dimensions: 125×63×8.7 mm (4.92×2.48×0.34 in)
- Weight: 117 g (4 oz)
- Operating system: Android 2.3.3 "Gingerbread" (officially upgradeable up to Android 4.0.4 "Ice Cream Sandwich", unofficially upgradeable up to Android 6.0 "Marshmallow")
- CPU: Qualcomm MSM 8255 1 GHz Scorpion (Snapdragon) Adreno 205 GPU
- Memory: 512 MB
- Storage: Up to 2 GB
- Removable storage: Up to 32 GB on microSD memory card
- Battery: Li-Po 1500 mAh
- Rear camera: 8.1 MP (3264×2448), Back-illuminated sensor Exmor R CMOS Sensor, Auto Focus, Face recognition, Geo-tagging, Image and video stabilizer, Smile detection, Touch focus, Video 720p HD (Android 2.3)
- Display: 4.2 inch 854×480 px FWVGA "Reality Display" TFT LCD at 233 PPI with mobile BRAVIA engine, 16M Colors
- Connectivity: Bluetooth 2.1 with A2DP microUSB 2.0; 3.5 mm audio jack Assisted GPS; Wi-Fi 802.11 b/g/n HDMI (Type D connector)
- Data inputs: Multi-touch capacitive touchscreen, Accelerometer, GPS, GLONASS
- Codename: Anzu

Sony Ericsson Xperia Arc is an Android smartphone introduced by Sony Ericsson. It was released on 24 March 2011, in Japan and on 1 April 2011, in Europe. The smartphone has a curved "arc" appearance, hence the name.

== Overview ==
- Manufacturer: Sony Ericsson
- Series: Xperia
- Codename: Anzu
- First Released: 24 March 2011
- Availability by Region: UK (April 2011)
- Predecessor: Sony Ericsson Xperia X10
- Successor: Sony Ericsson Xperia Arc S

== Specifications ==
- Form Factor: Slate
- Dimensions: 125 × 63 × 8.7 mm
- Weight: 117 g
- Operating System: Initially shipped with Android 2.3.3 (Gingerbread), upgradeable to Android 4.0.4 (Ice Cream Sandwich). Unofficial updates support Android 6.0 (Marshmallow).
- Processor: Qualcomm MSM8255 1 GHz Scorpion with Adreno 205 GPU
- Memory: 512 MB RAM
- Storage: Internal storage of up to 2 GB, expandable via microSD (up to 32 GB)
- Battery: 1500 mAh Li-Po

== Display and camera ==
- Display: 4.2-inch FWVGA (854 × 480) "Reality Display" with a pixel density of 233 PPI, utilizing Sony's Mobile BRAVIA Engine.
- Camera: 8.1 MP rear camera with Exmor R back-illuminated sensor. Features include auto-focus, face recognition, geo-tagging, image and video stabilization, smile detection, and 720p HD video recording.

== Connectivity ==
- Bluetooth: 2.1 with A2DP
- USB: microUSB 2.0
- Audio: 3.5 mm headphone jack
- GPS: Assisted GPS
- Wi-Fi: 802.11 b/g/n
- HDMI: Type D connector
- Sensors: Multi-touch capacitive touchscreen, accelerometer, GPS, and GLONASS support

== Regional variants and colors ==
The Xperia arc, also known by model numbers LT15i and LT15a, was sold in multiple regions with different model names based on geography. It was available in Midnight Blue, Misty Silver, Pink (Japan and South Korea), Black (US), and White and Black (South Korea and Mexico only).

== Design and features ==
The Sony Ericsson Xperia arc measures 8.7 mm at its thinnest point and has a curved surface, of which the phone is named after. The Xperia arc features a capacitive touchscreen supporting multi-touch input and a scratch-resistant glass display. It also includes a micro-HDMI output for connecting the device to external displays.

== Software and updates ==
The Xperia arc launched with Android 2.3 (Gingerbread) and was later officially updated to Android 4.0 (Ice Cream Sandwich) in mid-2012 for unlocked devices. The version of Android loaded featured Sony-made skins that modified stock Android to their style and the form factor of the phone. Carrier-locked devices received updates depending on the carrier's rollout schedule.

== Reception ==
The Xperia arc was revealed at CES 2011 in January. It was praised for its design and the quality of its camera, particularly the inclusion of Sony's Exmor R sensor, which improved low-light performance.

== See also ==
- Sony Ericsson Xperia arc S
- List of Xperia devices
- Sony Ericsson Xperia acro
- Galaxy Nexus

| Preceded by Sony Ericsson Xperia X10 | Sony Ericsson Xperia arc 2011 | Succeeded by Sony Ericsson Xperia arc S |
