= Mobile phone industry in Japan =

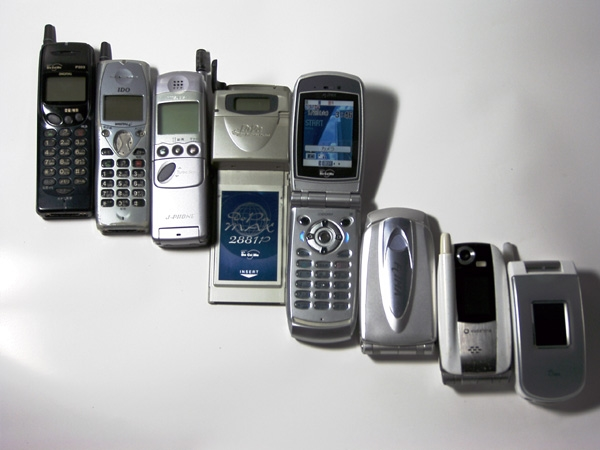
Japanese mobile phone handsets from 1997 to 2004

The Japanese mobile phone industry is one of the most advanced in the world. As of March, 2022 there were 199.99 million mobile contracts in Japan according to the Ministry of Internal Affairs and Communications. This is 158 percent of Japan's total population.

The mobile phone industry is currently transitioning to 5G and utilizing new technologies like Fully Virtualized Cloud Native Mobile Network (FVCNMN) currently led by Rakuten mobile. FVCNMN was previously considered impossible to deploy in a big scale.

In Japanese, mobile phone handsets (携帯電話端末, keitaidenwa-tanmatsu) are often referred to as simply keitai denwa (携帯電話) or keitai (携帯) for short.

There are four main mobile network operators (MNO) and a series of mobile virtual network operators (MVNO) which work by renting out a portion of the network of a MNO and providing a services on top of them.

Operator	Contracts Q3 2021	Q2 2021	Q3 2020
NTT Docomo	36.6%	-0.1	-0.3
KDDI Group	27.1%	-0.1	-0.3
SoftBank	20.9%	-0.2	-0.5
Rakuten Mobile	2.2%	+0.2	+1.4
Other MVNO	13.2%	+0.0	-0.2

== History ==
- In the year 1979, Nippon Telegraph and Telephone (NTT) launched the world's first generation (1G) mobile phone service in Tokyo as a car phone.
- In 1985, NTT offered Japan's first mobile phone service, called the "Shoulder Phone."
- In 1988, Mobile Communication Group, which later was absorbed into KDDI, started mobile phone service
- In 1993, NTT Docomo started its first digital mobile phone service (2G), using a Time division multiple access (TDMA) variant called Personal Digital Cellular.
- In 1994, Digital Phone Group and Tu-Ka Group, both of which later became SoftBank, started mobile phone service. In the same year, DDI Pocket, a subsidiary of KDDI, started PHS mobile phone service.
- In 1999, NTT Docomo started i-mode Internet service.
- In 2001, NTT Docomo premiered the world's first Third Generation mobile phone service (3G), using W-CDMA technology called FOMA.
- In 2002, KDDI started 3G service in Okinawa, using CDMA2000 technology. In the same year, J-Phone started 3G service using W-CDMA technology.
- In 2003, J-Phone changed its name to Vodafone.
- In 2006, Vodafone Japan was purchased by SoftBank and renamed to SoftBank Mobile. In the same year, MNP (Mobile Number Portability) was introduced.
- In 2007, Japanese regulator introduced new guideline for unbundling new handset price and service plan.
- In 2010, SoftBank Mobile stopped all non-3G services, focusing on 3G service only.
- In 2012, NTT Docomo stopped 2G services, which also made its car phone service to end.
- In 2020, Rakuten mobile starts offering 4.5G - 5G services to the public utilizing a Fully Virtualized Cloud Native Mobile Network

== Providers ==
There are four cellular service operators in Japan.

=== NTT Docomo ===
DoCoMo was spun off in 1991 from Nippon Telegraph and Telephone (NTT), NTT Docomo first offered its second-generation service known as Personal Digital Cellular (PDC). It now offers a 3G service using W-CDMA technology known as FOMA. The company is operating a world band W-CDMA network at 2100 MHz. As of February 2019, the number of subscribers is 79 million.

=== KDDI ===
KDDI was formed by the merger of KDD (International phone service operator), DDI (nationwide CDMA operator except for Kanto and Tokai area), and IDO (CDMA operator for Kanto and Tokai area) in 2000. They offer the au mobile phone service: its second generation service, using CDMA technology, and 3G service, using CDMA2000. Their operating bands are 800 MHz and 2100 MHz. As of March 2016, there are 46 million subscribers.

=== SoftBank ===

SoftBank purchased Vodafone Japan at $15b in 2006. SoftBank now offers 3G, 4G and 5G services using W-CDMA technology at 900 MHz and 2100 MHz. SoftBank was also the exclusive service provider of Apple's iPhone in Japan until November 2011. As of March 2016, there were 40 million subscribers. SoftBank acquired Y!mobile in 2010 and continued to use Y!mobile.

=== Rakuten Mobile ===

Rakuten Mobile was born in 2018 after Rakuten announcement of entry in the mobile business industry in 2017. In 2018 Rakuten was granted the 1.7 GHz band. By 2020 Rakuten Mobile started selling the first plan called Rakuten UN-LIMIT which uses 4.5 G and 5G technologies and relies on a Fully Virtualized Cloud Native Mobile Network to provide their services. By 2022, Rakuten had capture 2.2% of the total market and the number is rapidly increasing.

== Industry ==
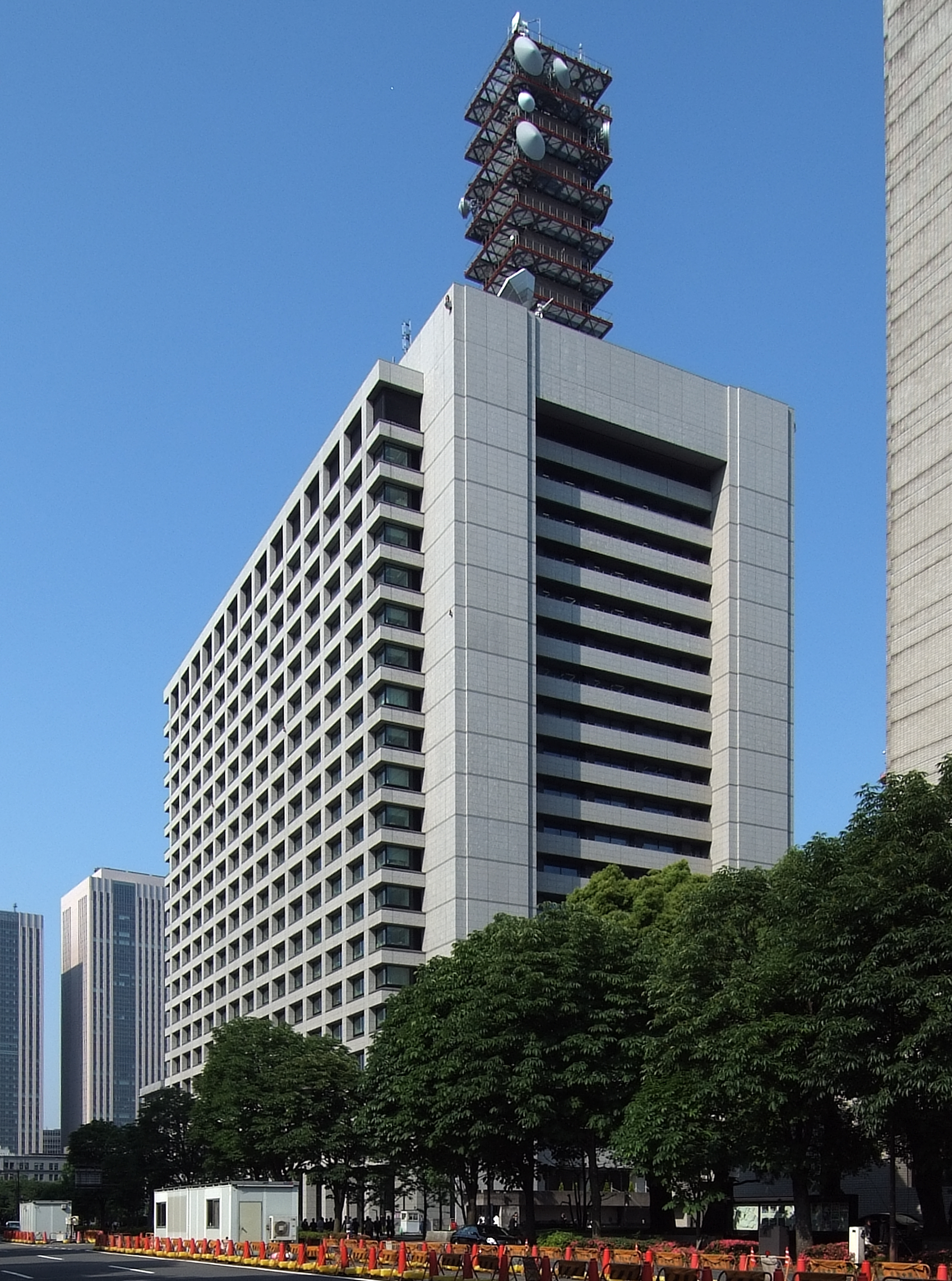
Central Government Bldg. No. 2 in Tokyo where the Ministry of Internal Affairs and Communications is housed

The Japanese mobile phone market is known for its extremely competitive and saturated market, which, combined with a complex regulatory environment, has led to growing consolidation among manufacturers and providers alike.

Mobile telecommunications operating licenses are administered by the Ministry of Internal Affairs and Communications. In Japan, there have never been band license auctions. Usually MIC issues operating licenses by just paper checking.

Collaboration by the various companies can be seen at the Yokosuka Research Park, near NTT's Yokosuka R&D Center, where many manufacturers have research and development laboratories offices. An outdoor testing site is also located there.

Since the introduction of new regulations about unbundling service plan and handset prices in 2008, the Japanese handset market has shrunk. At its peak in 2007, the total handset shipping amount was roughly 52M units. However, the number for 2009 was roughly 32M units. This caused a serious recession for the handset industry and a consolidation of companies due to the reliance which handset vendors had on the Japanese market.

Japan's PHS technology has been exported to China, Taiwan, and other countries. NTT Docomo's i-mode web technology had been used by Australia's Telstra, Russia's Mobile TeleSystems, UK's O2 and a few other mobile service providers overseas. NTT has been one of the main contributors to the 3G W-CDMA standard. NTT Docomo collaborated with AT&T Mobility to set up a 3G-compatible mobile phone network in Hawaii.

== Handsets ==
=== Manufacturers ===
The following manufacturers have marketed and sold handsets within Japan:

Japanese

- FCNT
- Kyocera
- NEC
- Sharp
- Sony

Non-Japanese

- Apple
- ASUS
- BlackBerry Limited
- Google
- HTC
- Motorola
- OPPO
- Samsung
- Xiaomi
- ZTE

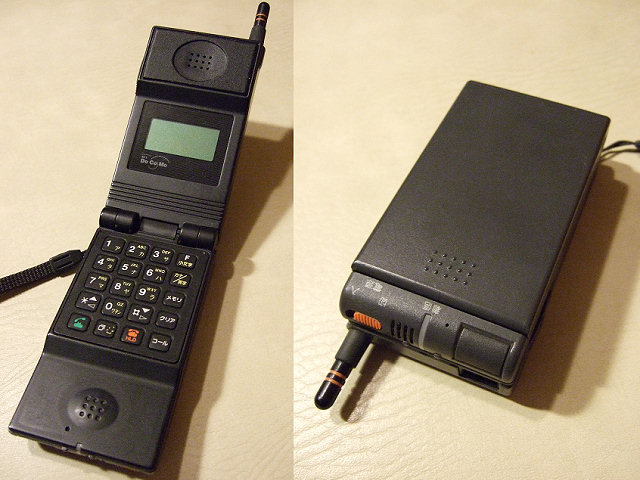
NEC TZ-804 Mova N (1991)

Sanyo Electric, although formerly an independent manufacturer of handsets, sold its handset business to Kyocera in 2008. Mitsubishi Electric exited the mobile phone market in April 2008. Nokia discontinued development of mobile phones for the Japanese market in 2009. The DoCoMo M702iS, released in December 2006, was the last Motorola phone launched in Japan until their return to the market in 2011.

Japanese manufacturers have had difficulty marketing their phones overseas. In 2009, out of all Japanese handset manufacturers, Sony Ericsson (now called Sony Mobile) sold the most handsets worldwide (after non-Japanese Nokia, Samsung, LG Electronics and Motorola); domestically, Sharp sold one quarter of the Japanese market, followed by Fujitsu, Panasonic, NEC and Kyocera.

=== Operating system ===
Japan's mobile phones traditionally used the ITRON operating system, but as the functions become more complex, they moved over to more generally used operating systems, such as Symbian OS, Embedded Linux, Windows Mobile and Android. Most handsets on the market today use Android or iOS.

=== Language input ===
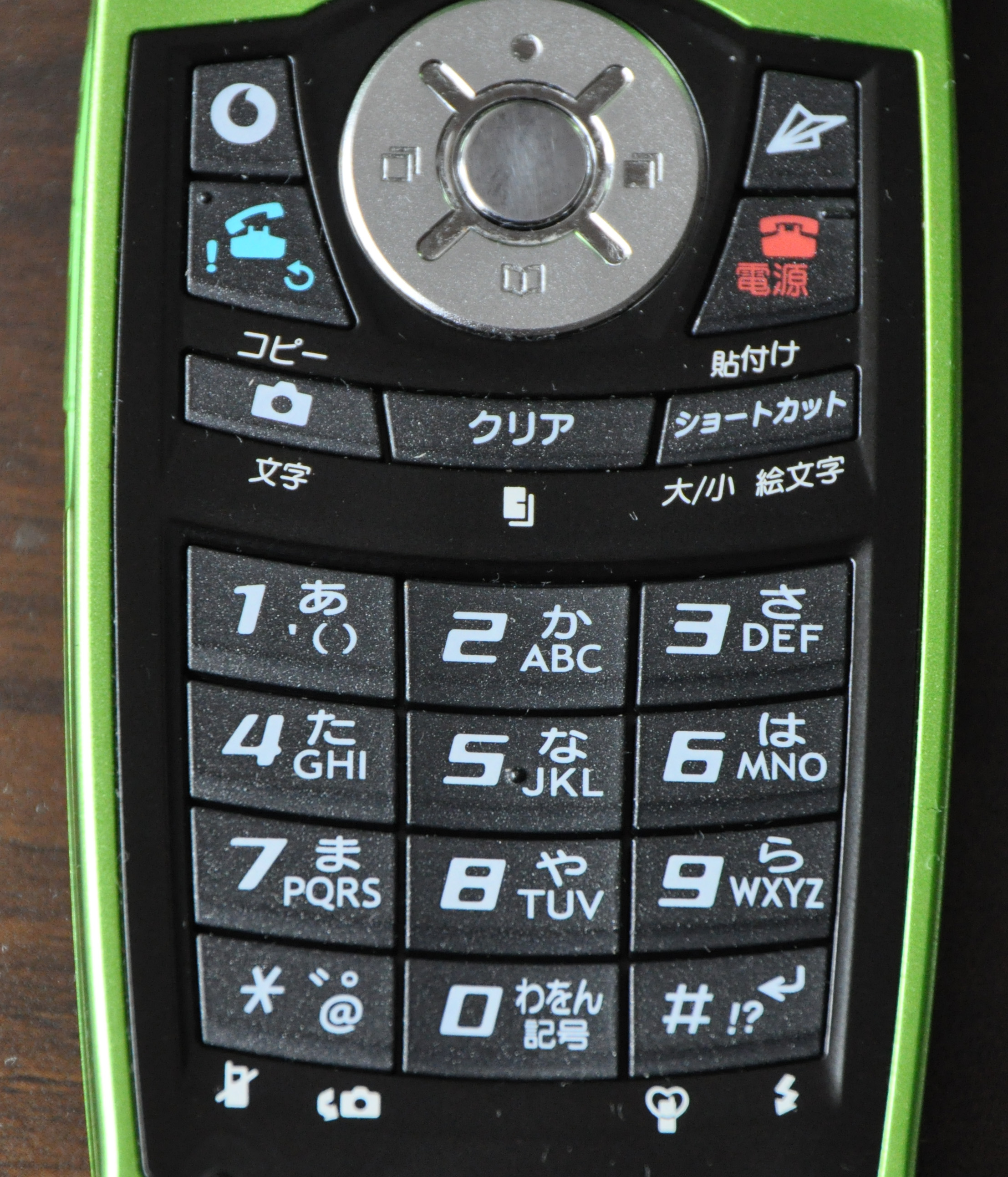
A typical Japanese mobile phone keyboard

Input on mobile phones is performed using hiragana, katakana, kanji, and alphanumeric characters. A character mode function allows the user to select from among these types of character input. Kanji characters are selected by first inputting hiragana, then converting (変換, henkan) the characters. Kana characters are laid out on the mobile phone keys in the 50 character table format: A-column characters on 1 key, Ka-column characters on the 2 key, etc.

The alphabetic character mode allows input of Roman characters; however, English-language word prediction (such as T9) is rarely implemented in Japanese handsets. Support for other languages and character sets, such as French, Russian (Cyrillic), and Chinese (both traditional and simplified characters), is not standard on handsets from domestic manufacturers.

=== Other characteristics ===
The Japanese are known for their development of emoji (絵文字, lit. "picture characters") and kaomoji (顔文字, lit. "face characters") to express emotions in email messages. A large number and variety of emoji and kaomoji are available on handsets. Foreign manufacturers (such as Apple), in order to ensure compatibility with Japanese-made handsets, have introduced emoji on their handsets around the world. Gmail and other email services have also introduced emoji that can be sent and received from mobile handsets as well as computers.

== Unique business practices ==
All handsets sold in Japan were formerly "locked" for use in Japan only, due to the demands of service providers. Likewise, providers refused to sell USIM cards by themselves without a handset or for a handset brought in from overseas, although NTT DoCoMo has recently relaxed this business practice. In accordance with the recommendations of the Ministry of Internal Affairs and Communications' mobile business consultative committee, some Japanese phone manufacturers began to produce unlocked handsets in 2011. Sharp, Fujitsu, NEC and Panasonic now offer a number of unlocked handsets.

== See also ==
- History of mobile phones
- Japanese mobile phone culture
- Mobile phone industry in China
- Mobile phone industry in India
- Mobile phone industry in Russia
- Mobile phone industry in South Korea
- Mobile Phone Museum
- Telecommunications in Japan
