= Bravia =

Japanese television brand of Sony Group

- Owner: Sony (2005–present); Bravia Inc. (2026–present)
- Type: mainly LCD, LED & OLED HDTV
- Retail availability: 2005–present
- Menu interface: XrossMediaBar (2005–2013); Google TV (2011–2013); Tile UI (2014); Android TV (2015–2020); Android TV via Google TV (2020–present)
- Predecessor: WEGA
- Related articles: HDTV; Sony
- Production: Tokyo, Japan; London, England; Tijuana, Mexico (Sony Baja California); Sydney, Australia; Westmoreland County, Pennsylvania, United States (Sony Technology Center-Pittsburgh); Shanghai, China; Hong Kong, China; Singapore; Istanbul, Turkey

Bravia (stylized as BRAVIA) is a brand of televisions currently produced by Bravia Inc. based in Ōsaki, Tokyo, Japan, a joint venture between TCL Electronics and Sony Corporation. The brand name is owned by Sony, which has produced flat-panel LCD televisions using the brand since 2005. Bravia products have been produced under the joint venture since 2026, with Sony continuing to be responsible for design and technologies while TCL does manufacturing and distribution.

The Bravia name is a backronym for "Best Resolution Audio Visual Integrated Architecture". Outside of LCD and OLED televisions, the brand has also been used on mobile phones in some markets, mainly Japan, as of 2007.

== History ==
Bravia replaced the "LCD WEGA" brand that Sony used for their LCD TVs until summer 2005 (and early promotional photos of the first Bravia TVs still carried the WEGA moniker). The WEGA name was still associated with bulky tube TVs (dating back to the FD Trinitron) so Sony decided to have a fresh start. The Bravia moniker was unveiled in September 2005. It was part of an effort to revive Sony's TV making business which had been struggling in the growing market of flat-panels in the face of Sharp Aquos and a growing Samsung.

Marketing for Bravia kicked off with the renowned two-and-a-half minute "Balls" TV commercial that made its debut on November 6, 2005, featuring 250,000 real colorful rubber balls released on a hill in San Francisco. This was followed by another commercial in 2006 called Paint, both marketed with the tagline Colour like no other.

As of 2009, Bravia televisions and their components are manufactured at Sony's plants in Mexico, Japan, and Slovakia for their respective regions and are assembled from imported parts in Brazil, Spain, China, Malaysia, and Ecuador. Principal design work for Bravia products is performed at Sony's research facilities in Japan, in the research and development department at the Sony de Mexico facility in Baja California, Mexico, and at the Sony Europe facility in Nitra, Slovakia.

In its home market of Japan, Bravia started off well, but in 2009 its share fell behind Sharp (Aquos), Panasonic (Viera) and Toshiba (Regza). Starting in 2014, as part of Sony President and CEO Kazuo Hirai's restructuring to turn Sony around, Sony spun-off the business into a new Bravia subsidiary to produce these products.

=== Joint venture ===
In early 2026, Sony Corporation and TCL Electronics announced a partnership to restructure Sony's home entertainment business. Following a memorandum of understanding in January, the companies signed definitive agreements on March 31, 2026, to establish Bravia Inc., a joint venture that will assume global operations for the brand. Sony remains the owner of the brand, retains a 49% stake in the joint venture, and continues to be responsible for the development, design, and technologies of Bravia products. TCL, in turn, becomes responsible for the manufacturing and distribution of the televisions, following an industrial model similar to that adopted by Apple, in which the company retains control over design and technology while outsourcing production.

== Product range ==
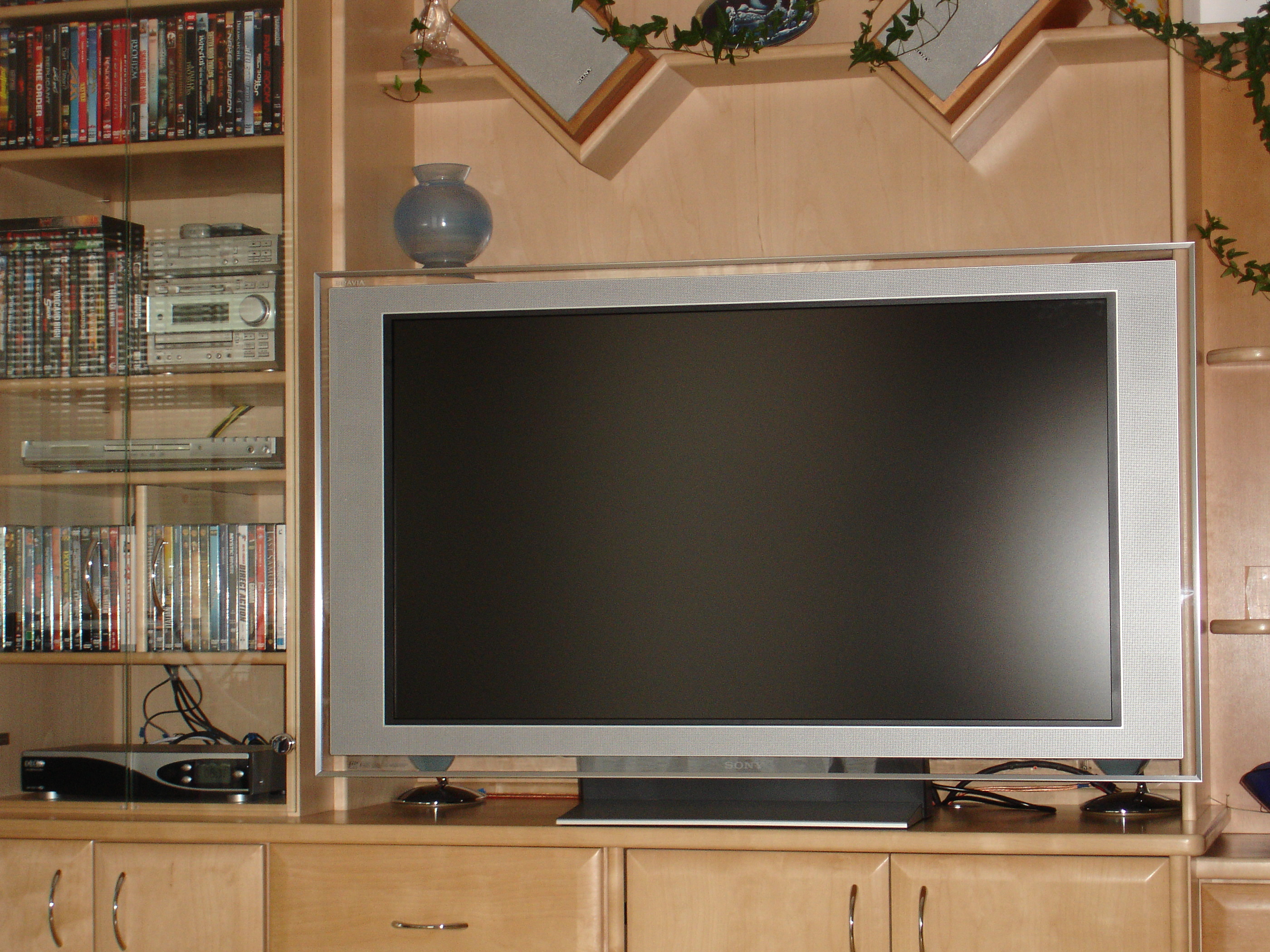
Sony Bravia X-2000 (2007)

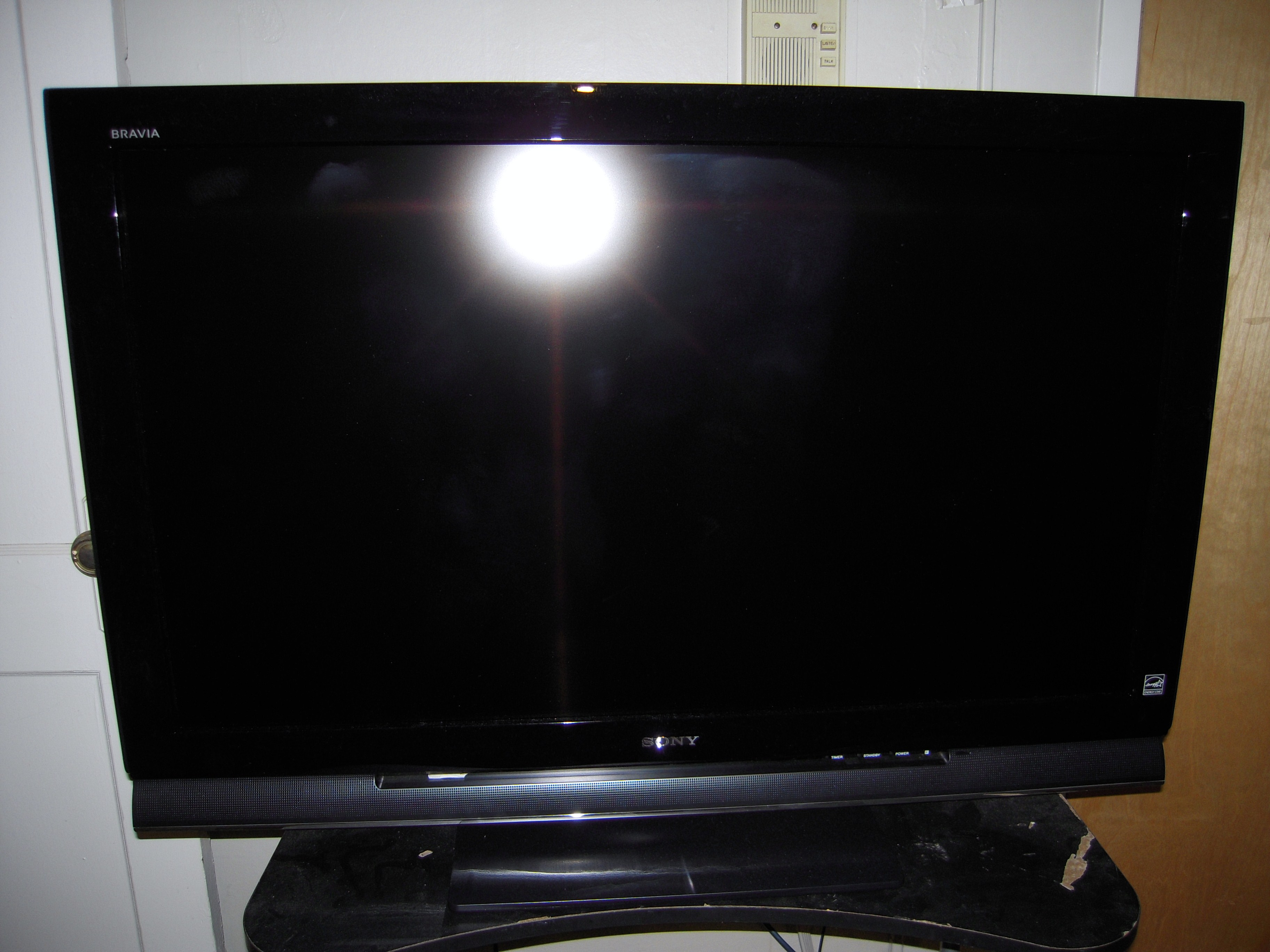
Sony Bravia S-4100 HDTV (2008)

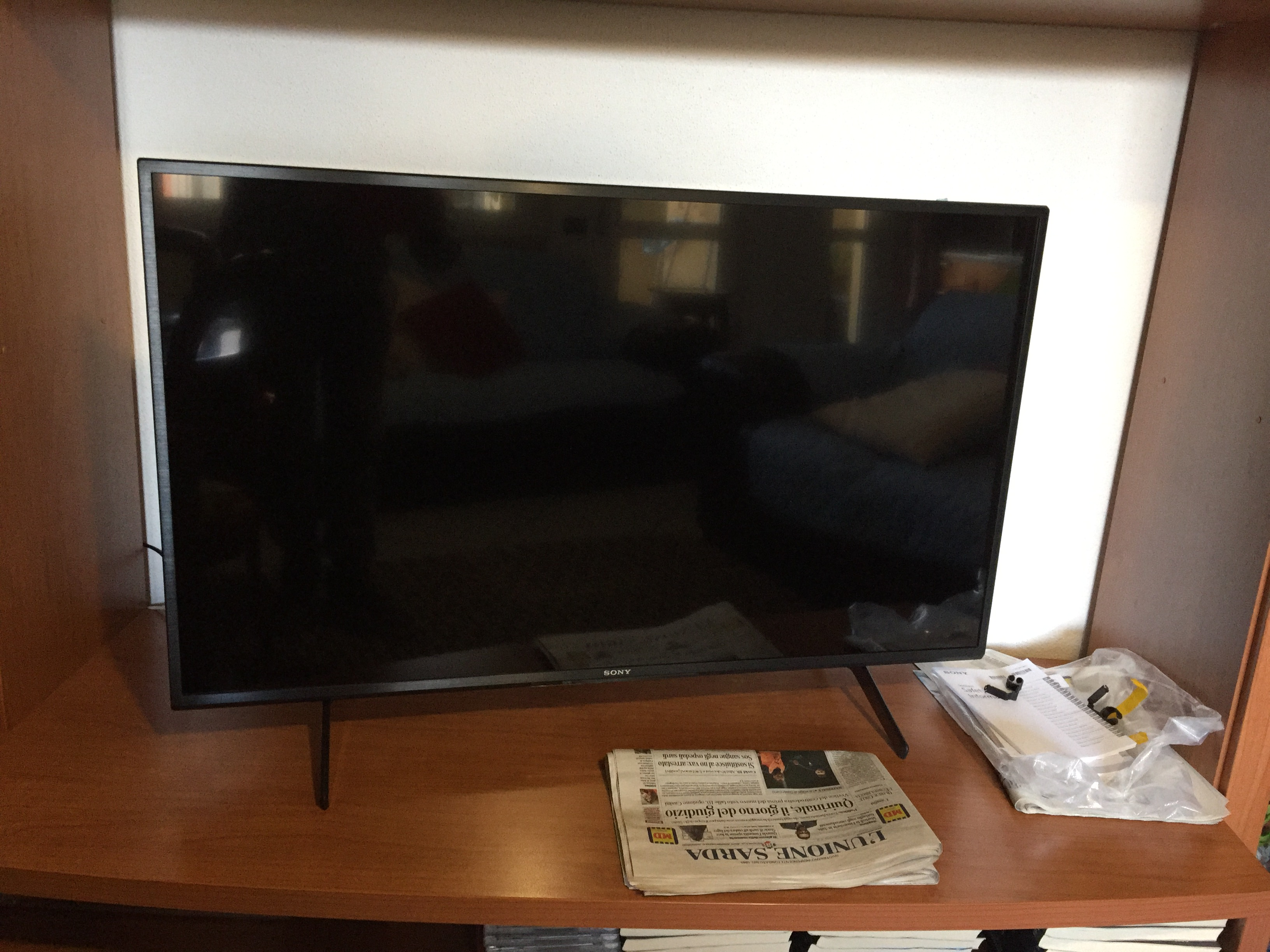
Sony Bravia 3 (2024)

=== TVs ===
From 2005 to 2009, the Bravia naming convention consisted of a single letter series which (in European markets) ranged from the U and T series on the budget end, S and V in the middle, and W, X and luxurious XBR at the top. In 2010 this was changed into a two letter format rolled out globally, ranging from BX to EX to NX, HX and LX.

In May 2013 Sony introduced their first 4K Bravia TV models smaller than X900 from late 2012. In May 2015, Sony launched their first lineup of Android television Bravia models that allowed users to access content from services like YouTube, Netflix and Hulu, as well as install apps and games from the Google Play Store. In addition, Bravia TV models were eventually integrated with Google Assistant for controlling home automation and voice commands.

In September 2016, Sony announced that TVs older than 2012 will lose access to YouTube.

Sony introduced their first 4K Ultra HD OLED Android TV under the Bravia brand, named as the A1E in January 2017 with an X1 Extreme processor. The A8F was the next OLED TV introduced by Sony at CES 2018. At IFA 2018, the A9F with an X1 Ultimate processor was unveiled. In 2019, Sony introduced newer version 4K OLED models, A8G and the Master Series A9G, followed by the A8H in 2020. For 2021 Sony offered the world's first cognitive intelligence TVs with its latest XR A.I. Cognitive Processor in the new A80J and Master Series A90J.

In 2024, the models sold are: Bravia 3,7,8,9 and Bravia X90L, A95L.

In 2026, Sony produced updated Bravia II True RGB 4K HDR Google TV with Gemini (2026) processing in models of all sizes ranging from 50" to 98".

=== Accessories ===
In April 2007, Sony launched the Bravia TDM-IP1, a docking cradle to permit playback of audio and video hosted on an Apple iPod on a Bravia model television.

Current accessories available include a Skype camera (CMUBR100) and Wi-Fi adapter (UWABR100).

=== Sony Bravia Internet TV and Video ===
Sony Bravia Internet Video first became available in late 2009 on Internet enabled Bravia TV's, later becoming available on Sony Blu-ray and home theatre systems. The original Bravia Internet Video was built around Sony's XMB interface and had several streaming media partners including: Amazon Video On Demand, YouTube, Yahoo!, Netflix and Sony Video (Qriocity). 2011 saw a revamp of Bravia Internet Video, with a rework of the interface and an added Skype capability.

Sony Bravia Internet TV is the first TV to incorporate Google TV, currently only available in the US. It plans to revolutionize IPTV.

XBR8 is a series of Sony Bravia LCD High Definition Televisions. They were released into the US marketplace starting in September 2008.

The 46- and 55-inch models of the XBR8 series features an RGB LED backlight system, which Sony calls Triluminos. The new backlight system is claimed to provide a truer and higher color spectrum and allows this series of televisions to rival plasma displays in terms of dark blacks. This model also marked the debut of Sony's new video processor, the Bravia Engine 2 Pro. The display panel uses ten-bit processing and offers the 120 Hz MotionFlow technology.

The XBR8 line offers two screen sizes; the 46" (KDL-46XBR8) was released on September 29, 2008. The second model, the 55" (KDL-55XBR8) became available for order in October 2008.

In the United Kingdom, recent Bravia Televisions also include YouView built in, which gives users access to an interactive EPG in addition to on-demand services from the BBC and ITV incorporated into a single search menu.

=== Green TV ===
For sale in Japan on July 30, 2008, Sony's "green" product, a flat-panel 32-inch TV for ¥150,000 (US$1,400; €900) Bravia KDL-32JE1 offered ecological consumers 70% lower energy consumption than regular models with same image quality. It was claimed that the product had reduced carbon emissions to 79 kilograms (174 pounds) a year in comparison to other Bravia products.

=== Mobile phones ===
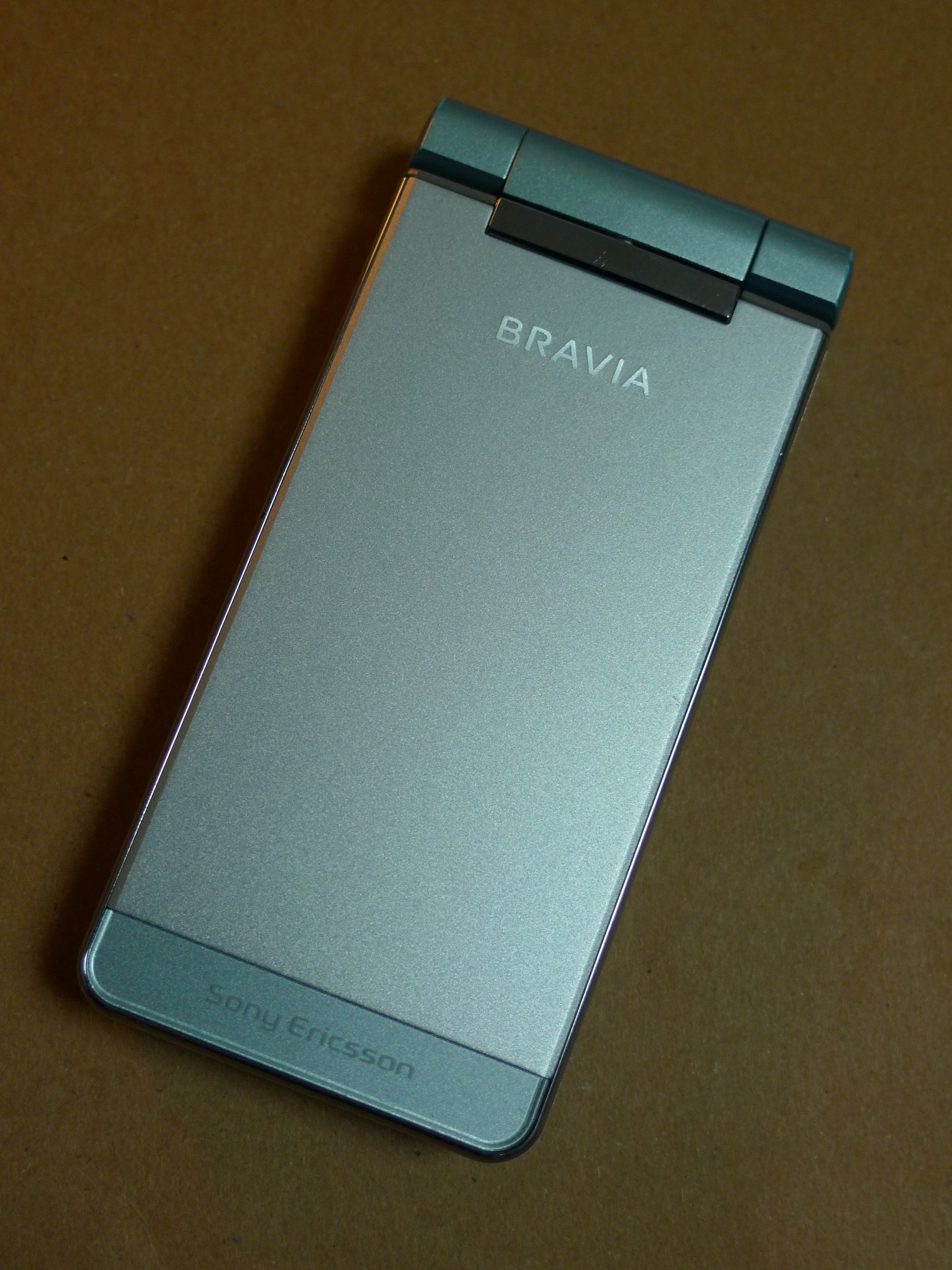
Bravia-branded Sony Ericsson smartphone for the Japanese market (Docomo FOMA SO906i, released 2008)

Sony uses a Bravia image processing engine in high-end mobile devices produced by its Sony Mobile Communications, starting with the Xperia arc model in 2011. Subsequent flagship models of Sony's smartphone range such as the Xperia S, and Xperia Z use enhanced versions of the Bravia engine.

In addition, Bravia brand phones have been produced by Sony/Sony Ericsson. Bravia brand phones are able to watch 1seg terrestrial television.

- For NTT DoCoMo

FOMA SO903iTV (Released in June 2007)
FOMA SO906i (Released in June 2008)
FOMA SO-01C (Sony Ericsson Xperia Arc) (Released in March 2011)

- For au by KDDI

U1 (Released in December 2009)
S004 (Released in May 2010)
S005 (Released in November 2010, successor of S004)

=== Bravia Theatre ===
In 2024, Bravia Theatre was introduced, consisting of audio products, with exclusive features for compatible Bravia TVs. The 2024 lineup of Bravia Theatre audio products include: Bravia Theatre Quad, Bravia Theatre U, soundbars Bravia Theatre Bar 9 and Bar 8. The 2025 lineup include: soundbars Bravia Theatre Bar 6 and Bravia Theatre System 6.

Accessories

There are accessories available for the products in the Bravia Theatre audio products lineup.

Backward compatible accessories with Bravia Theatre products are: the SA-SW5 and the SA-SW3 subwoofers, the SA-RS3S and SA-RS5. Accessories made for BRAVIA Theatre products are: the Bravia Theater Rear 8 rear speakers (SA-RS8) and the Sony Bravia Theatre Sub 7 wireless subwoofer.

== Internals ==
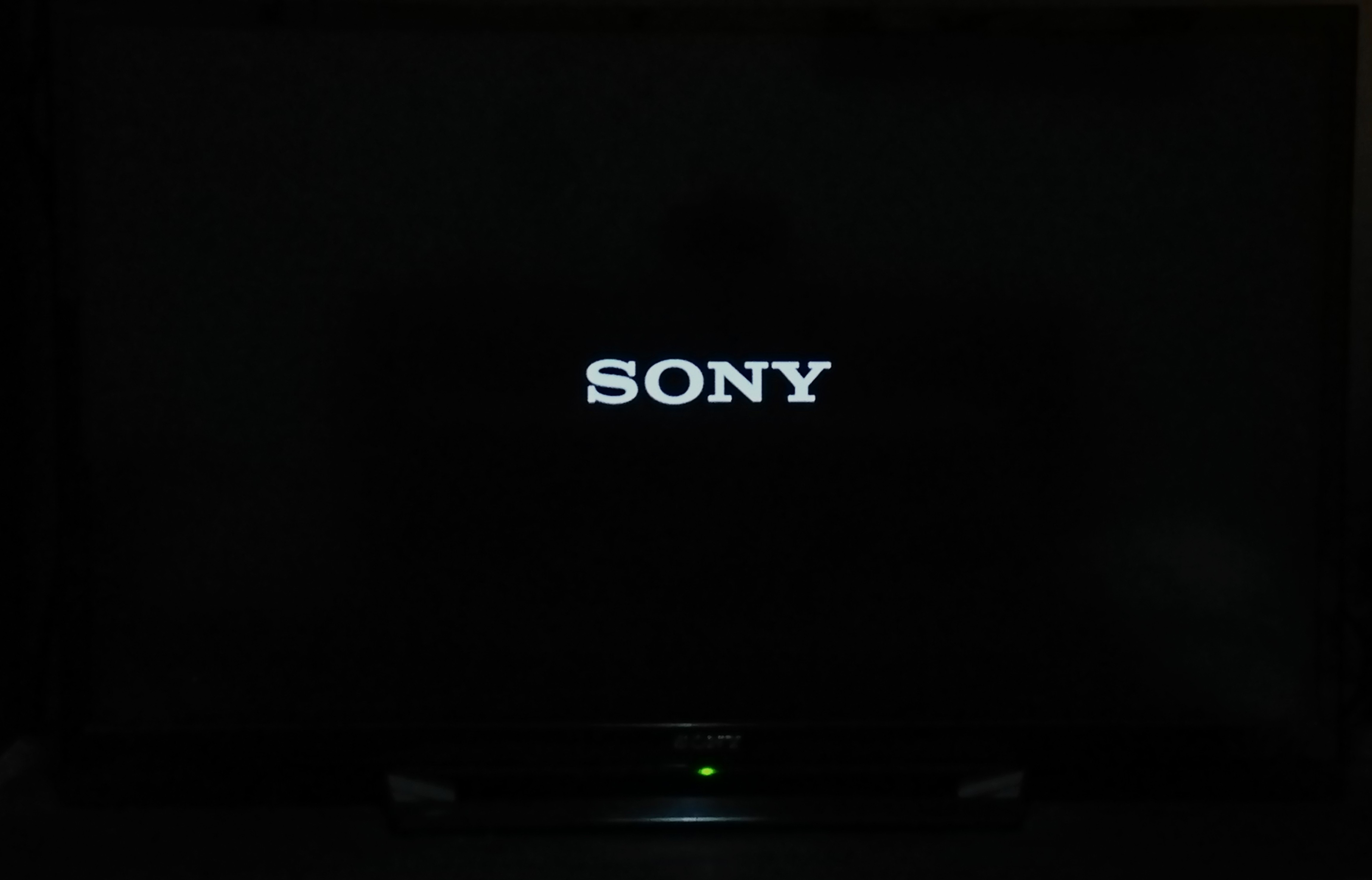
The Sony logo, as it appears on startup on a Bravia TV

The LCD panels within Bravia TVs are manufactured by Sony Corporation with a special architecture. Since 2010, the high end Bravia LX, HX and selected NX series use a 10th gen Sony Bravia ASV panel. The 8th gen SPVA panel from Sony LCD continue to serve other midrange and budget Bravia models.

Many Sony televisions with USB connectivity run Linux.

=== Upgrading and maintenance ===
The software can be upgraded via a USB type A interface labeled "DME^{x} / service only" and via the Internet for later models.

2006–2007 models may be updated using a memory card or USB. Depending upon the country and TV standard, the tuner may need a service device to update it.

It appears that units manufactured through November 2005 for sale in Asia and North America contained a software bug that prevented the device from powering up/down after 1200 hours. A free upgrade is available.

=== Uses and features ===
- Can be used to watch live TV
- Can stream original content from streaming apps
- Supported by Dolby audio

== Region locking ==
Sony TVs sold in 2019 and earlier are region locked, which limited apps and media to be playable only in the same region that the TV was purchased from. However, as of 2020, with the release of the H series Bravia TVs, this is no longer the case, and any language can now be selected.

=== Language table ===
The two letters after the Sony TV codename in the build number denote the region (Japan, USA-Canada, South America, Europe, Pacific-Asia, China, Hong Kong, Taiwan).

List of supported languages for 2019 and earlier Sony TVs
| Language | English Name | JP | UC | SA | EU | PA | CN | HK | TW |
|---|---|---|---|---|---|---|---|---|---|
| Afrikaans | Afrikaans | No | No | No | No | Yes | No | No | No |
| አማርኛ | Amharic | No | No | No | No | Yes | No | No | No |
| العربية | Arabic | No | No | No | Yes | Yes | No | No | No |
| অসমীয়া | Assamese | No | No | No | No | Yes | No | No | No |
| Azərbaycan | Azerbaijani | No | No | No | No | Yes | No | No | No |
| Беларуская | Belarusian | No | No | No | Yes | No | No | No | No |
| Български | Bulgarian | No | No | No | Yes | No | No | No | No |
| বাংলা | Bangla | No | No | No | No | Yes | No | No | No |
| Bosanski | Bosnian | No | No | No | Yes | No | No | No | No |
| Català | Catalan | No | No | No | Yes | No | No | No | No |
| Čeština | Czech | No | No | No | Yes | No | No | No | No |
| Dansk | Danish | No | No | No | Yes | No | No | No | No |
| Deutsch (Österreich) | German (Austria) | No | No | No | Yes | No | No | No | No |
| Deutsch (Schweiz) | German (Switzerland) | No | No | No | Yes | No | No | No | No |
| Deutsch (Deutschland) | German (Germany) | No | No | No | Yes | No | No | No | No |
| Deutsch (Liechtenstein) | German (Switzerland) | No | No | No | Yes | No | No | No | No |
| Ελληνικά | Greek | No | No | No | Yes | No | No | No | No |
| English (Australia) | English (Australia) | No | No | No | No | Yes | No | No | No |
| English (Canada) | English (Canada) | No | Yes | No | No | No | No | No | No |
| English (United Kingdom) | English (United Kingdom) | No | No | No | Yes | Yes | Yes | Yes | Yes |
| English (India) | English (India) | No | No | No | No | Yes | No | No | No |
| English (Ireland) | English (Ireland) | No | No | No | Yes | No | No | No | No |
| English (Malta) | English (Malta) | No | No | No | Yes | No | No | No | No |
| English (New Zealand) | English (New Zealand) | No | No | No | No | Yes | No | No | No |
| English (Singapore) | English (Singapore) | No | No | No | No | Yes | No | No | No |
| English (United States) | English (United States) | Yes | Yes | Yes | No | No | No | No | No |
| Español (España) | Spanish (Spain) | No | No | No | Yes | No | No | No | No |
| Español (México) | Spanish (Mexico) | No | Yes | No | No | No | No | No | No |
| Español (Estados Unidos) | Spanish (United States) | No | Yes | Yes | No | No | No | No | No |
| Eesti | Estonian | No | No | No | Yes | No | No | No | No |
| Euskara | Basque | No | No | No | Yes | No | No | No | No |
| فارسی | Persian | No | No | No | No | Yes | No | No | No |
| Suomi | Finnish | No | No | No | Yes | No | No | No | No |
| Français (Belgique) | French (Belgium) | No | No | No | Yes | No | No | No | No |
| Français (Canada) | French (Canada) | No | Yes | No | No | No | No | No | No |
| Français (Suisse) | French (Switzerland) | No | No | No | Yes | No | No | No | No |
| Français (France) | French (France) | No | No | No | Yes | Yes | No | No | No |
| Galego | Galician | No | No | No | Yes | No | No | No | No |
| ગુજરાતી | Gujarati | No | No | No | No | Yes | No | No | No |
| हिन्दी | Hindi | No | No | No | No | Yes | No | No | No |
| Hrvatski | Croatian | No | No | No | Yes | No | No | No | No |
| Magyar | Hungarian | No | No | No | Yes | No | No | No | No |
| Indonesia | Indonesian | No | No | No | No | Yes | No | No | No |
| Íslenska | Icelandic | No | No | No | Yes | No | No | No | No |
| Italiano (Svizzera) | Italian (Switzerland) | No | No | No | Yes | No | No | No | No |
| Italiano (Italia) | Italian (Italy) | No | No | No | Yes | No | No | No | No |
| עברית | Hebrew | No | No | No | Yes | No | No | No | No |
| 日本語 | Japanese | Yes | No | No | No | No | No | No | No |
| Қазақ тілі | Kazakh | No | No | No | Yes | No | No | No | No |
| ខ្មែរ | Khmer | No | No | No | No | Yes | No | No | No |
| ಕನ್ನಡ | Kannada | No | No | No | No | Yes | No | No | No |
| 한국어 | Korean | No | No | No | No | Yes | No | No | No |
| Кыргызча | Kyrgyz | No | No | No | No | Yes | No | No | No |
| ລາວ | Lao | No | No | No | No | Yes | No | No | No |
| Lietuvių | Lithuanian | No | No | No | Yes | No | No | No | No |
| Latviešu | Latvian | No | No | No | Yes | No | No | No | No |
| Македонски | Macedonian | No | No | No | Yes | No | No | No | No |
| മലയാളം | Malayalam | No | No | No | No | Yes | No | No | No |
| Монгол | Mongolian | No | No | No | No | Yes | No | No | No |
| मराठी | Marathi | No | No | No | No | Yes | No | No | No |
| Melayu | Malay | No | No | No | No | Yes | No | No | No |
| မြန်မာ | Burmese | No | No | No | No | Yes | No | No | No |
| Norsk bokmål | Norwegian Bokmål | No | No | No | Yes | No | No | No | No |
| नेपाली | Nepali | No | No | No | No | Yes | No | No | No |
| Nederlands (België) | Dutch (Belgium) | No | No | No | Yes | No | No | No | No |
| Nederlands (Nederland) | Dutch (Netherlands) | No | No | No | Yes | No | No | No | No |
| ଓଡ଼ିଆ | Odia | No | No | No | No | Yes | No | No | No |
| ਪੰਜਾਬੀ | Punjabi | No | No | No | No | Yes | No | No | No |
| Polski | Polish | No | No | No | Yes | No | No | No | No |
| Português (Brasil) | Portuguese (Brazil) | No | No | Yes | No | No | No | No | No |
| Português (Portugal) | Portuguese (Portugal) | No | No | No | Yes | Yes | No | No | No |
| Română | Romanian | No | No | No | Yes | No | No | No | No |
| Русский | Russian | No | No | No | Yes | Yes | No | No | No |
| සිංහල | Sinhala | No | No | No | No | Yes | No | No | No |
| Slovenčina | Slovak | No | No | No | Yes | No | No | No | No |
| Slovenščina | Slovenian | No | No | No | Yes | No | No | No | No |
| Shqip | Albanian | No | No | No | Yes | No | No | No | No |
| Српски (ћирилица) | Serbian (Cyrillic) | No | No | No | Yes | No | No | No | No |
| Srpski (latinica) | Serbian (Latin) | No | No | No | Yes | No | No | No | No |
| Svenska | Swedish | No | No | No | Yes | No | No | No | No |
| Kiswahili | Swahili | No | No | No | No | Yes | No | No | No |
| தமிழ் | Tamil | No | No | No | No | Yes | No | No | No |
| తెలుగు | Telugu | No | No | No | No | Yes | No | No | No |
| ไทย | Thai | No | No | No | No | Yes | No | No | No |
| Filipino | Filipino | No | No | No | No | Yes | No | No | No |
| Türkçe | Turkish | No | No | No | Yes | No | No | No | No |
| Українська | Ukrainian | No | No | No | Yes | No | No | No | No |
| اردو | Urdu | No | No | No | No | Yes | No | No | No |
| O’zbek | Uzbek | No | No | No | No | Yes | No | No | No |
| Tiếng Việt | Vietnamese | No | No | No | No | Yes | No | No | No |
| 中文 (简体) | Chinese (Simplified) | No | No | No | No | Yes | Yes | No | No |
| 中文 (香港) | Chinese (Hong Kong) | No | No | No | No | Yes | No | Yes | No |
| 中文 (繁體) | Chinese (Traditional) | No | No | No | No | Yes | No | No | Yes |
| IsiZulu | Zulu | No | No | No | No | Yes | No | No | No |
