= Sports photography =

Photography genre

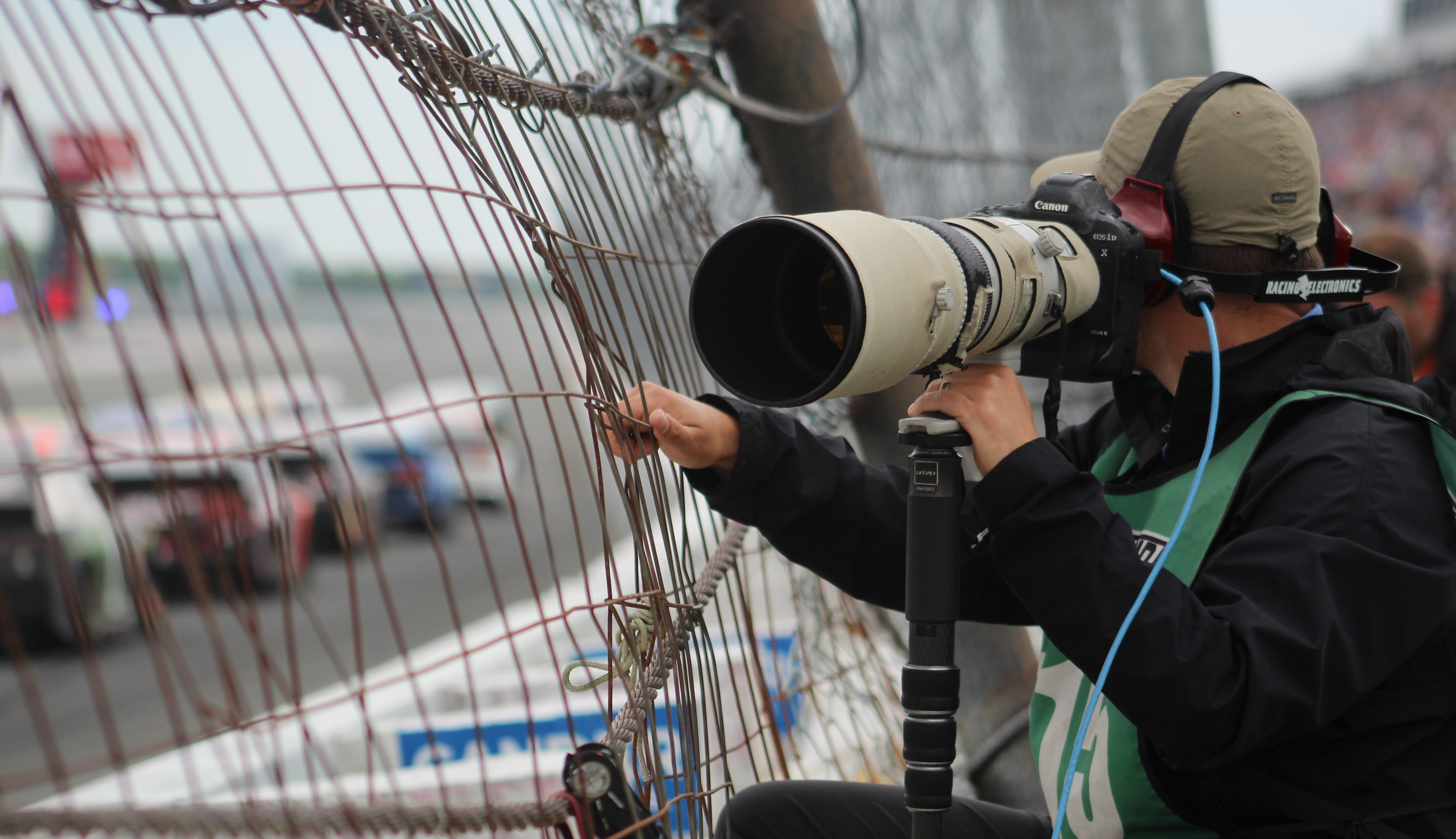
A sports photographer looking around during 2019 Pocono 400.

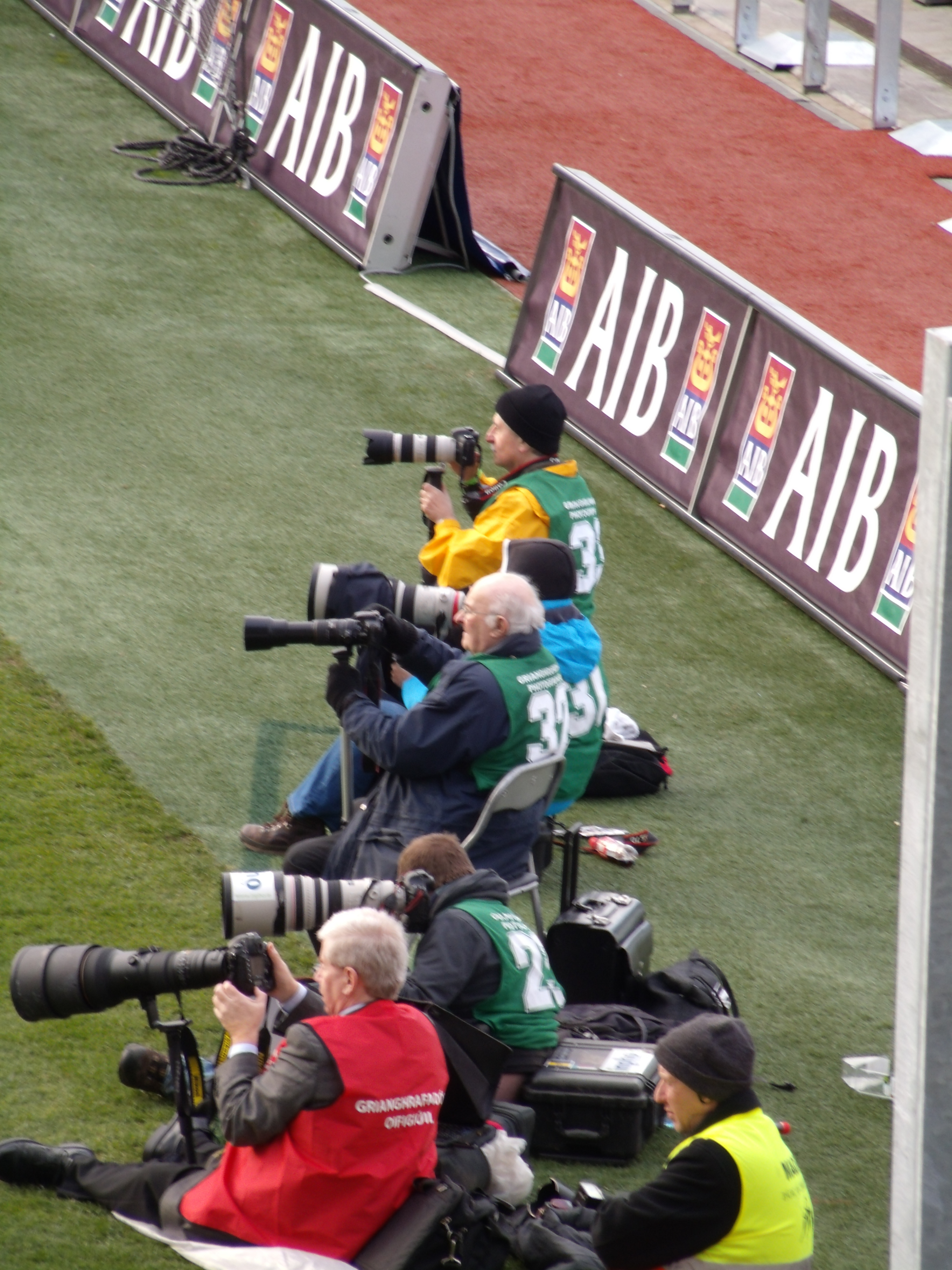
Photographers at a game at Croke Park, Ireland. Note the use of telephoto lenses.

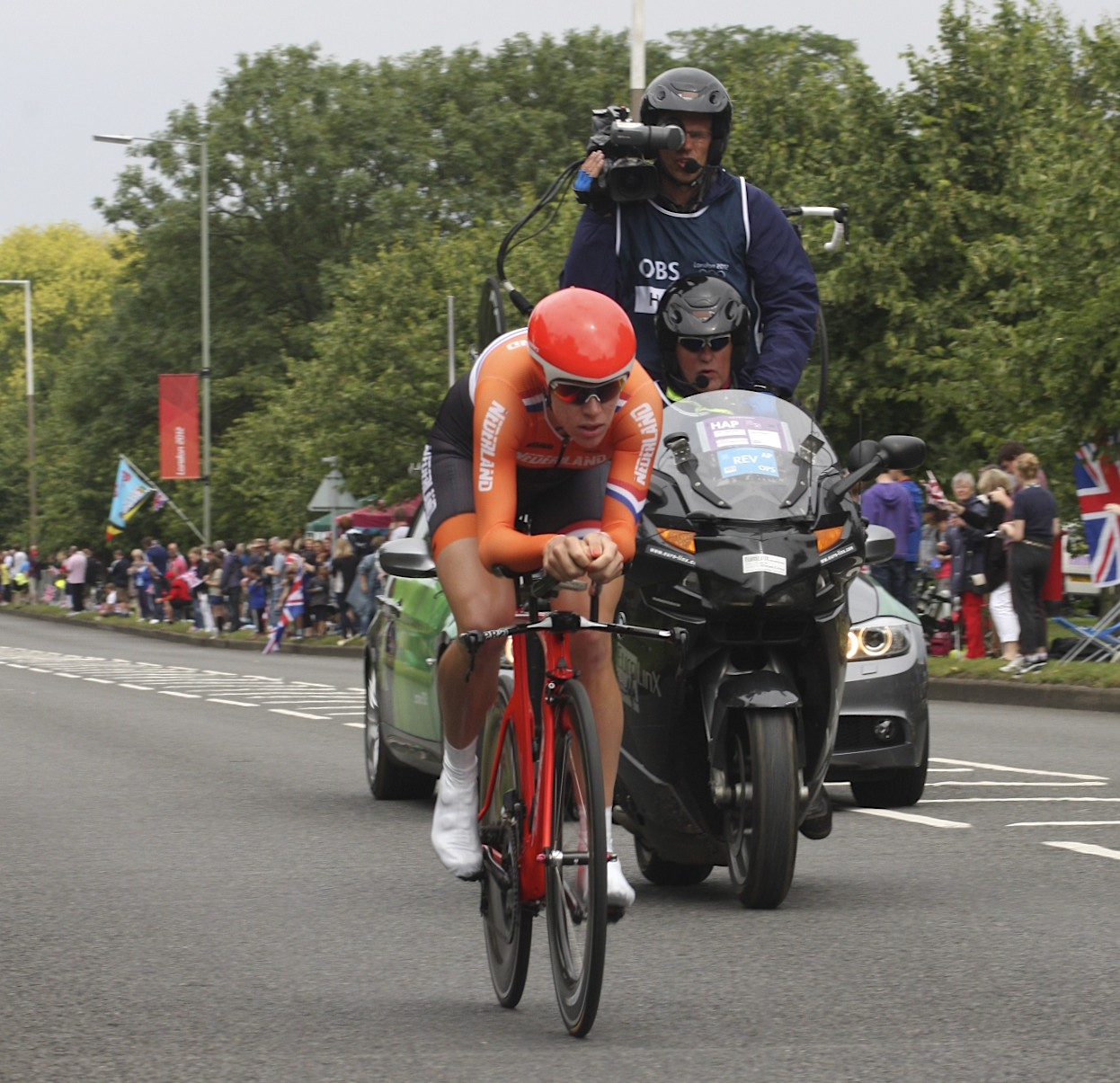
A cameraperson follows Ellen van Dijk at the 2012 Summer Olympics. Photographing from a motor is done often in endurance sports

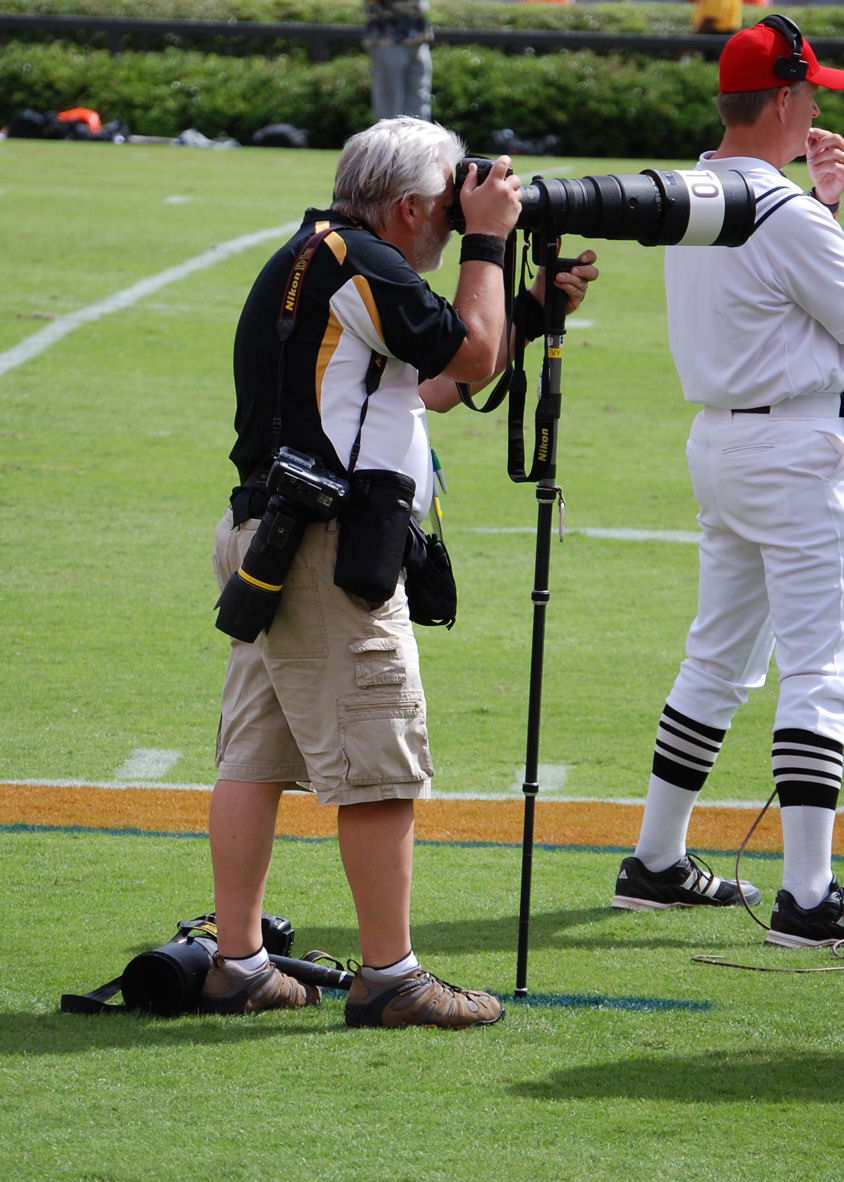
Photographer on the sideline of an American football game with multiple cameras, long lenses, and monopods.

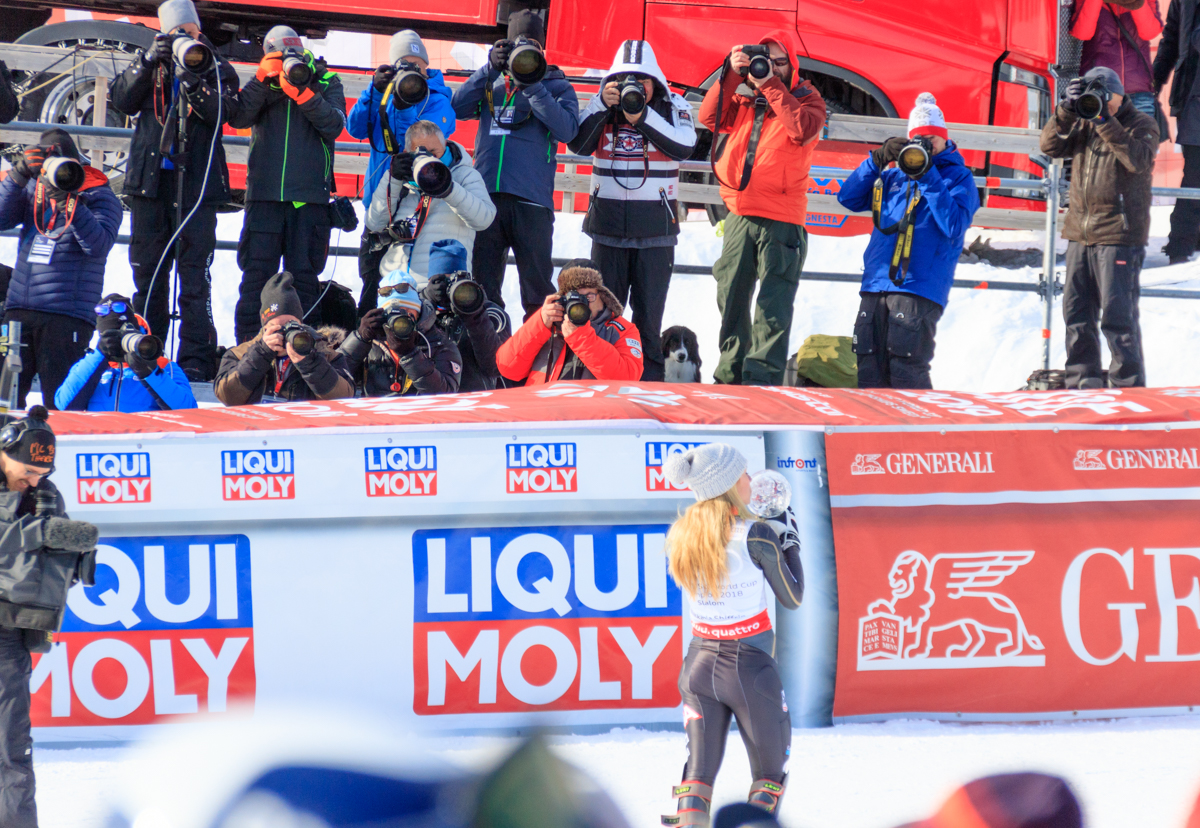
Photographers capture skier Mikaela Shiffrin

Sports photography refers to the genre of photography that covers all types of sports.

In the majority of cases, professional sports photography is a branch of photojournalism, while amateur sports photography, such as photos of children playing association football, is a branch of vernacular photography.

The main application of professional sports photography is for editorial purposes. Dedicated sports photographers usually work for newspapers, major wire agencies or sports magazines. However, sports photography is also used for advertising purposes both to build a brand and to promote a sport in a way that cannot be accomplished by editorial means.

== Equipment ==
Equipment typically used for sports photography includes a digital single-lens reflex (DSLR) camera or Mirrorless Camera with high continuous shooting speeds and interchangeable lenses ranging from 14mm to 400mm or longer in focal length, depending on the type of sport. The proper lenses are very important as they allow the photographer to reach closer or farther as quickly as possible to keep up with the gameplay. Essential accessories include a monopod or tripod for stability and extra batteries. Longer focal length lenses are typically used to photograph action in sports such as football, while wide angle lenses can be used for sideline and close-up athlete photos.

=== Camera bodies ===
The preferred camera bodies for modern sports photography have fast autofocus and high burst rates, typically 8 frames per second or faster. The current flagship sports DSLR cameras produced by Canon and Nikon are the Canon EOS-1D X Mark III and the Nikon D6. These are popular in professional sports photography, but there are also multiple other camera bodies to choose from. Bodies like the Canon R5, the Canon R6, the Sony A1 and the Sony A9 offer full frame sensors to get the highest quality image without compromising ISO, Aperture, and Shutter Speed in the camera settings.

=== Lenses ===
Different sports favor different lenses, but sports photography usually requires fast (wide aperture) telephoto lenses, with fast autofocus performance. Fast autofocus is needed to focus on movement, telephoto to get close to the action, and wide aperture for several reasons:

- The background is dramatically put out of focus due to a shallow depth of field, resulting in better subject isolation.
- The lenses can focus more quickly due to the increase in light entering the lens, which is important with fast-moving action.
- Faster shutter speeds can be used to freeze the action.

Extremely wide apertures (such as f/1.2 or f/1.4) are more rarely used, because at these apertures the depth of field is very shallow, which makes focusing more difficult and slows down autofocus. The main distinction is between outdoor sports and indoor sports. In outdoor sports, the distances are greater and the light is brighter, while in indoor sports, the distances are lesser and the light is dimmer. Accordingly, outdoor sports tend to have longer focal length long focus lenses with slower apertures, while indoor sports tend to have shorter lenses with faster apertures.

Both zoom and prime lenses are used; zoom lenses (generally in the 70–200, 75–300, 100–400 or 200-400 range) allow a greater range of framing; primes are faster, cheaper, lighter, and optically superior, but are more restricted in framing. For example, the Nikon AF-S NIKKOR 400mm f/2.8G ED VR AF lens and the Canon EF 300mm f/2.8L IS II USM lens are both fixed telephoto lenses which cannot zoom.

Apertures of f/2.8 or faster are most often used, though f/4 is also found, specifically on brighter days. Particularly visible are the Canon super telephoto lenses, whose distinctive white casing (to dissipate the sun's heat) is recognizable at many sporting events. Of these, the Canon 400mm f/2.8 is recommended for field sports such as football.

This varies with sport and preference; for example golf photographers may prefer to use a 500mm f/4 as opposed to a 400mm f/2.8 as it is a lighter lens to be carried around all day.

Indoor sports photography, as mentioned earlier, can present its own challenges with less distance between the action and photographer and extreme lighting. For example, competition cheerleading allows for photographers to be up close to the action while looking upwards directly into harsh stage lighting against a black background. A different approach to such a situation is to use the prime lens named a "nifty fifty". The shutter speed is extremely fast while still setting the aperture to bring in enough light. In this scenario, a budget telephoto lens would produce both dark and blurry images. Using a prime 50mm lens is a budget friendly option for many other indoor events such as school plays, concerts, dance recitals, etc.

=== Remote cameras ===
Sports photographers may use remote cameras triggered by wireless shutter devices (i.e. Pocket Wizards) to photograph from places they could not otherwise stay, for example in an elevated position such as above a basketball basket, or to be in two places at once, i.e. at the start and the finish, like at horse racing.

== Technique ==
A live action shot of the game-winning goal in Game 7 of a 2017 Stanley Cup playoffs series in ice hockey. Such live action shots of a game-changing moment require the photographer to frame their images from a distance, with speed and adjust camera settings spontaneously.

In order to minimize motion blur of moving subjects, the light sensitivity ("ISO" value) is increased, which shortens the necessary exposure time to capture sufficient light. The trade-off of increasing light sensitivity is more noise, so sports photography is most effective in daylight and with higher-end cameras that are equipped with larger image sensors which capture more light and support higher light sensitivities.

Location is often important for sports photography. At big events, professional photographers often shoot from VIP spots with the best views, usually as close to the action as possible. Most sports require the photographer to frame their images with speed and adjust camera settings spontaneously to prevent blurring or incorrect exposure. Some sports photography is also done from a distance to give the game a unique effect.

Getting to know the subjects is critical in capturing emotion. Effects and editing can only do so much for a photo. Understanding who athletes are by having a conversation with them can change someone's view on the person, making them a better photographer.

Predicting what happens next in a sports game is critical in understanding how to compose a shot. The action moves fast so time should be taken to prepare before going out and taking photos.

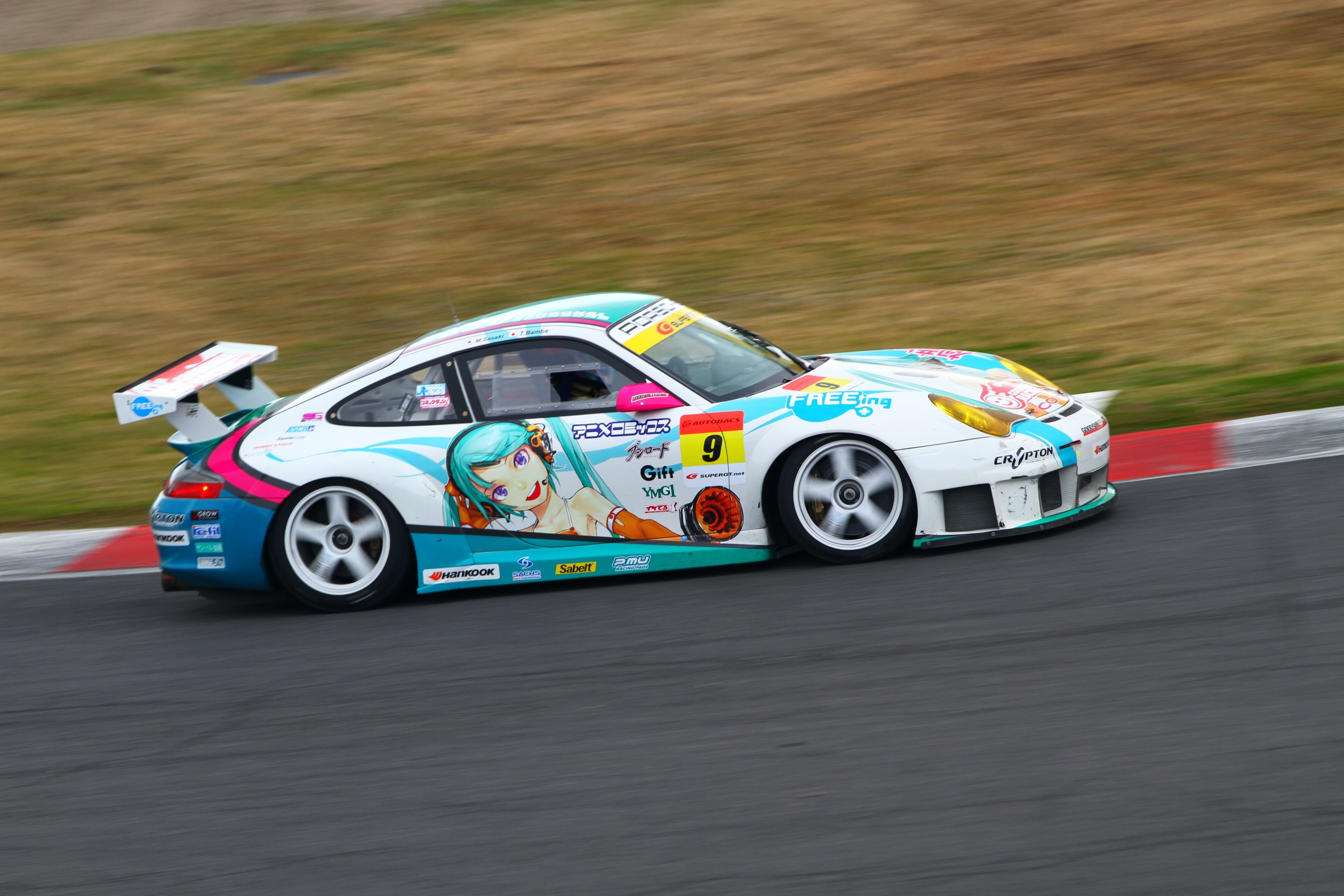
Panning of Porsche 996 GT3 RSR

Shutter speed is critical to catching motion, thus sports photography is often done in shutter priority mode or manual. A frequent goal is to capture an instant with minimal blur, in which case a minimal shutter speed is desired, but in other cases a slower shutter speed is used so that blur shows to capture the motion, not simply the instant. A particular technique is panning, where the camera uses an intermediate shutter speed and pans with the subject, yielding a relatively sharp subject and a background blurred in the direction of motion, yielding a sense of speed – compare speed lines.

ISO speed is often high (to allow faster shutter speeds) and may be left in auto.

Photos are often taken in burst mode to capture the best moment, sometimes in combination with JPEG rather than RAW shooting (JPEG files being smaller, these allow longer bursts).

=== Strip photography ===
While the vast majority of sports photography focuses on capturing a moment, possibly with some blur, the technique of strip photography is sometimes used to instead show motion over time. This is most prominent in a photo finish, but can also be used for other purposes, often yielding unusually distorted images.

== Type ==
=== Commemorative photograph ===
In association football, before kick-off, a starting XI commemorative photograph is taken.

The tradition of taking a starting XI photograph has existed since 1863, when one was taken for Wanderers F.C. and following inaugural 1871–72 FA Cup, starting XI photograph became common throughout England.

Taking a starting XI photograph also occurred in 1930 FIFA World Cup, and, at present, in international A matches and international club matches such as UEFA Champions League, taking a starting XI commemorative photograph is included in match day protocols.

On occasion, some teams took both starting XI photograph and full squad photograph in their historic matches, for example, Brazil in 2002 FIFA World Cup Final and Tottenham Hotspur in the 2019 UEFA Champions League Final.

== Notable sports photographers ==
A number of notable international photographers are well known for their sports photography work; Some of them have often worked for the magazines Life or Sports Illustrated.

- Russ Adams (tennis photographer)
- Marc Aspland
- Andrew D. Bernstein
- Chris Burkard
- Hanson Carroll
- Gerry Cranham
- James Drake
- Bill Frakes
- Scott Kelby
- Neil Leifer
- Carol Newsom
- Adam Pretty
- Ron St. Angelo
- John G. Zimmerman

== See also ==
- ArtButMakeItSports
