= PocketWizard =

Wireless radio triggering system for off-camera lighting

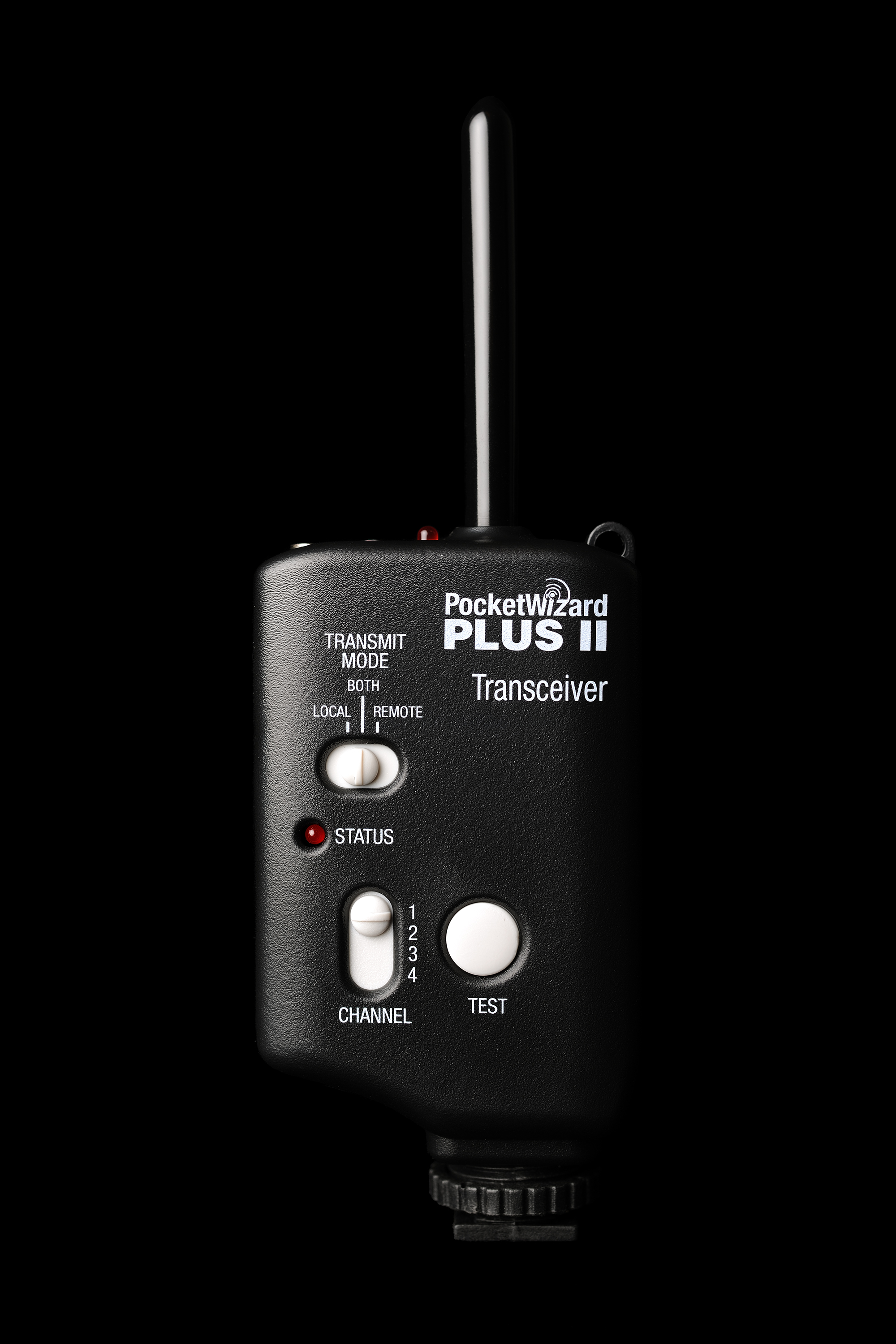
PocketWizard Plus II

The PocketWizard is a Wireless radio triggering system for off-camera lighting developed in the late 1990s, by LPA Design, an American company based in South Burlington, Vermont.

It requires a transmitter electrically connected to the camera, usually mounted on the camera's hot shoe, to trigger a remote receiver connected to a remote flash unit via a PC Cord.

== See also ==
- Guide number
- Flash synchronization
- Ring flash
- Flash comparison
