= Flash comparison =

A list of flash guns, for easy comparison of strobes, from different manufactures. The list is intended to supplement the list of photographic equipment makers.

== List of current models ==
Name	Guide number (Note: At ISO 100 and Maximum zoom at F = 1.0. Manufactures value unless otherwise noted.)	Sync connection	Angle of coverage	Variable power (manual)	TTL	Bounce	Swivel	Interval (Note: Normally given as the time it takes from full power to full power shot, with fresh alkaline batteries)	Optical slave	Other notes	HSS
Cactus RF60	56m at 105mm	Yes, 3.5mm	24-105mm	1/1-1/128 (1/3 steps)	no	yes	yes	5s (3s with NiMH)	yes	Built-in radio receiver	yes (Note: HSS Sympathy mode provides HSS support when working with TTL flashes)
Canon Speedlite 270EX II	27m	No	28/50mm	?	E-TTL II	yes (0/60/75/90)	no	3.9 sec	Yes (only when using Canon master)		Yes
Canon Speedlite 320EX	32m	No	24/50mm	?	E-TTL II	yes (0/60/75/90)	yes (+90, -180)	2.3 sec	Yes (only when using Canon master)		Yes
Canon Speedlite 430EX II	43m/141 ft at 105mm zoom-head position	No	24/28/35/50/70/80/105mm (plus 14mm diffusor)	1/1-1/64 (1/3 steps) [1/1-1/128 when used as slave]	E-TTL II	yes	yes (+90, -180)	3.7 sec (AA-Alkaline), 2 sec (AA-NiMH)	Yes (only when using Canon master)		Yes
Canon Speedlite 580EX II	58m/190 ft at 105mm zoom-head position	Yes	24-105mm (14mm diffusor)	1/1-1/128 (1/3 steps)	E-TTL II	yes	yes (360)	3.5 sec	Yes (only when using Canon master)	Can be used as wireless (optical) controller for other Canon flashes	Yes
Canon Speedlite 600EX-RT	60m/ 196.9 ft at 200mm zoom-head position	Yes	20-200mm (14mm diffusor)	1/1-1/128 (1/3 steps)	E-TTL II	yes	yes (360)	3.3 sec	Yes (only when using Canon master)	Can be used as wireless (optical) controller for other Canon flashes	Yes
Lumopro LP160	42m/140 ft	Miniphone+PC	24, 28, 35, 50, 70, 85, 105mm	1/1, 1/2, 1/4, 1/8, 1/16, 1/32, 1/64	no	yes	yes	4 sec (AA-NiMH)	Yes		
Metz mecablitz 36 AF-4 digital	36m/118 ft	no	28-85mm (manual)		TTL (Note: Available in Canon, Nikon, Olympus/Panasonic, Pentax/Samsung, Sony models)	yes	yes	5	Yes	Metz service Firmware update	
Metz mecablitz 48 AF-1 digital	48m/158 ft	no	24-105mm (18mm diffuser)	25 levels	E-TTL II (Note: Available in Canon, Nikon/Fujifilm, 4/3, Pentax/Samsung, Sony models)	yes	yes	3.5	Yes (only E-TTL/i-TTL slave)	Can update firmware over USB, High Speed Sync	Yes
Metz mecablitz 58 AF-1 digital	58m/190 ft	no	24-105mm (18mm diffuser)	25 levels	TTL	yes	yes	3.5	Yes (only E-TTL/i-TTL slave)	Can operate as E-TTL/i-TTL master Can update firmware over USB Has secondary reflector High Speed Sync	Yes
Nikon SB-600 AF Speedlight	30m/98 ft (Note: 35mm zoom-head position, 20 C/68 F)	No	24-85mm, 18mm with flip down diffuser	1/1-1/64	i-TTL/CLS	yes	yes	3.5 sec	Yes (only when using Nikon master)		Yes
Nikon SB-900 AF Speedlight	34m/111.5 ft	Screwlock PC	14-200mm	1/1-1/128	TTL/i-TTL/CLS	yes	yes	4sec	yes		Yes
Nissin Di622	44m/145 ft @105mm	PC	24–105 mm	1/2, 1/4, 1/8, 1/16, 1/32	i-TTL (Nikon) E-TTL/E-TTL II (Canon)	yes	yes	5sec	yes, both i-TTL and basic slave	Nikon and Canon versions Can update firmware over USB	
Nissin Di622 MARK II	44m/145 ft @105mm	PC	24–105 mm	1/2, 1/4, 1/8, 1/16, 1/32	i-TTL (Nikon) E-TTL/E-TTL II (Canon)	yes	yes	5sec	yes, both i-TTL and basic slave	Nikon and Canon and Sony versions Can update firmware over USB	
Nissin Di866	60m/198 ft @105mm (overrated)	PC	18, 24-105mm	1/1-1/128, 1/3 EV	i-TTL/CLS (Nikon) E-TTL/E-TTL II (Canon)	yes	yes	5.5sec	yes, both i-TTL and basic slave	Nikon and Canon versions Can update firmware over USB Has sub-flash	
Pentax AF-200FG	20m	No	28mm	1/1, 1/2, 1/4	TTL	no	no	4sec	no		
Pentax AF-360FGZ II	36m	X-Sync	24-85mm	1/1-1/64	PTTL	yes	yes	6sec	yes		
Pentax AF-540FGZ	54m	X-Sync	24-85mm	1/1-1/64	PTTL	yes	yes	6sec	yes	Headsize: 70x45mm/2.75x1.77"	
Sigma EF 500 DG ST	50m/165 ft	No	28-105mm	1/1,1/16	TTL (Note: Available in Sigma, Nikon, Canon, Minolta and Pentax models)	yes	yes	6sec	no		
Sigma EF 500 DG Super	50m/165 ft	No	28-105mm	8 levels	TTL	yes	yes	6sec	yes		
Sigma EF 530 DG ST	53m/175 ft	No	24-105mm	1/1,1/16	TTL (Note: Available in Sigma, Nikon, Canon, Sony and Pentax models)	yes	yes	6sec	no		
Sigma EF 530 DG Super	53m/175 ft	No	24-105mm (17mm diffuser)	1/1-1/64 (Sigma/Canon 1/1-1/128)	TTL	yes	yes	6sec	yes		
Sony HVL-F58AM	58 at 105 mm	Yes (proprietary for external HVL-F56AM or HVL-F58AM only)	24-105mm (16mm diffuser)	Yes (1/1-1/32)	TTL/ADI, Wireless TTL/ADI	Yes	Yes	3-5	Yes (Body only/Or HVL-F58AM/HVL-F20AM on Sony A900 or HVL-F58AM on Sony A700)	HSS, Battery booster connector, Wireless Ratio Control	Yes
Sony HVL-F42AM	42 at 105 mm	no	24-105mm (16mm diffuser)	Yes (1/1-1/32)	TTL/ADI, Wireless TTL/ADI	Yes	Yes	3-4	Yes (Body only/Or HVL-F58AM on Sony A900 or on Sony A700)	HSS	Yes
Vivitar 285HV	42m/140 ft	Yes, proprietary jack	28-105mm	1/1, 1/2, 1/4, 1/16	no	yes	no	10sec	no		
Yongnuo YN460	25m/85 ft (50mm ISO100)	No	fixed	1/1, 1/2, 1/4, 1/16, 1/32, 1/64	no	yes	yes	5sec	yes		no
Yongnuo YN460 II	36m/120 ft (50mm ISO100)	No	fixed	1/1, 1/2, 1/4, 1/16, 1/32, 1/64	no	yes	yes	5sec	yes		no
Yongnuo YN462	24m/80 ft (50mm ISO100)	No	fixed	1/1 - 1/64 (analog)	no	yes	yes	5sec	no	Same as YN460, but with analog power selector and no optical slave sensor	no
Yongnuo YN465	24m/80 ft (50mm ISO100)	No	fixed	1/1 - 1/64 (analog)	E-TTL II (Canon) / i-TTL (Nikon)	yes (-10 to +90)	yes (-180 to +90)	2sec (1.2 with NiMH)	no		no
Yongnuo YN468 II	21.1m/ ft (50mm ISO100, as measured; official is 33m at 35mm)	PC	24-85mm (18mm diffuser)	1/1 - 1/128	E-TTL II (Canon) / i-TTL (Nikon)	yes (-10 to +90)	yes (-90 to +180)	1.8sec (1.0 with NiMH)	yes		no
Yongnuo YN560	58m (at 105mm)	PC	24-105mm (18mm diffuser)	1/1 - 1/128 (with 1/3 steps)	no	yes (-7 to +90)	yes (0 to 270)	3.0sec	Yes (S1, S2)		no
Yongnuo YN560 II	58m (at 105mm)	PC	24-105mm (18mm diffuser)	1/1 - 1/128 (with 1/3 steps)	no	yes (-7 to +90)	yes (0 to 270)	3.0sec	Yes (S1, S2)	= YN560 + LCD	no
Yongnuo YN560 III	58m (at 105mm)	PC	24-105mm (18mm diffuser)	1/1 - 1/128 (with 1/3 steps)	no	yes (-7 to +90)	yes (0 to 270)	3.0sec	Yes (S1, S2)	= YN560 II + RF603 built-in (2.4G radio receiver)	no
Yongnuo YN560 IV	58m (at 105mm)	PC	24-105mm (18mm diffuser)	1/1 - 1/128 (with 1/3 steps)	no	yes (-7 to +90)	yes (0 to 270)	3.0sec	Yes (S1, S2)	= YN560 II + YN560TX built-in (2.4G radio controller)	no
Yongnuo YN565	54m (at 105mm)	PC	24-105mm	1/1 - 1/128 (with 1/3 steps)	E-TTL II	yes	yes (360)	3.5sec	Yes (only when using Canon/Nikon master)		no
Yongnuo YN568	58m (at 105mm)	PC	24-105mm			yes	yes (360)	3sec			no
Yongnuo YN585 EX	58m (at 105mm)	PC	20-105mm (14mm diffuser)	1/1 - 1/128 (with 1/3 steps)	P-TTL (Pentax)	yes (-7 to +90)	yes (360)	3.0sec	Yes (S1, S2, SP [Pentax])	Rear-curtain sync, FEC, FEB, USB Port (firmware upgrade), Auto zoom, AF-assist beam	no

== List of discontinued models ==
Name	Guide number	Sync connection	Angle of coverage	Variable power (manual)	TTL	Bounce	Swivel	Interval	Optical slave	Discontinued	Other notes
Cactus KF36	ACTUAL DATA 30m/100 ft at 50mm (overrated as 37m/140 ft)	Yes, proprietary jack	28-105mm	1/1, 1/2, 1/4, 1/16	no	yes	no	10sec	no		Vivitar 285HV clone
Canon Speedlite 580ex	37m/140 ft (50mm ISO100)(or 58/190 ft at 105mm)	No	17-105mm	1/1-1/128	eTTL and Canon's infrared system	yes	yes	0.1 to 3 sec for normal flash, 0.1 to 3 sec for quick flash	no		The flash foot is easily modified to include a sync connection
Lumopro LP120	30m/100 ft	Miniphone+PC	28mm, 50mm, 85mm (manual)	1/1, 1/2, 1/4, 1/8, 1/16, 1/32	no	yes	yes	6.5 sec (AA-NiMH)	Yes		
Sony HVL-F56AM	56 at 85 mm	yes (proprietary for external HVL-F56AM or HVL-F58AM only)	24-85mm (17mm diffuser)	Yes (1/1-1/32)	TTL/ADI, Wireless TTL/ADI	Yes	Yes	5-6	Yes (Body only/Or HVL-F58AM on Sony A900)		HSS, Battery booster connector
Sony HVL-F36AM	36 at 85 mm	no	24-85mm (17mm diffuser)	No	TTL/ADI, Wireless TTL/ADI	Yes	No	5-6	Yes (Body only/Or HVL-F58AM on Sony A900)		HSS
Nikon SB-26 AF Speedlight	18m (at 18mm) / 50m (at 85mm) at ISO100	Screwlock PC	18 - 85mm	1/1 - 1/64	TTL	yes	yes	3sec	yes		Built in wide flash adapter and bounce card.
Nikon SB-28 AF Speedlight	18m (at 18mm) / 50m (at 85mm) at ISO100	Screwlock PC	18 - 85mm	1/1 - 1/64	TTL	yes	yes	3sec	no		Built in wide flash adapter and bounce card.
Nikon SB-80DX AF Speedlight	14m (at 18mm) / 50m (at 85mm) at ISO100	Screwlock PC	14 - 105mm	1/1 - 1/128	TTL	yes	yes	3sec	yes		Built in wide flash adapter and bounce card.
Nikon SB-800 AF Speedlight	38 (at 35mm) / 56m (at 105mm) at ISO100	Screwlock PC	24-105mm	1/1-1/128	i-TTL/CLS	yes	yes	6sec	yes	October 2008	Built in wide flash adapter and bounce card.
Vivitar 283	36m/120 ft at ISO100 (at 35mm)	Vivitar Connector	fixed (35mm)	1/1 (Note: 1/1-1/32 with VP-1 http://www.photonomikon.com/index.php/vivitar-vp-1-varipower-adapter-review/)	no	yes	no	11sec	no		Auto Thyristor.
Vivitar 550FD	4.5m at ISO100 24m at ISO100	No	fixed	1/1	TTL	yes	no	7sec	no		Auto Thyristor.
