= Guide number =

Photoflash exposure setting measurement

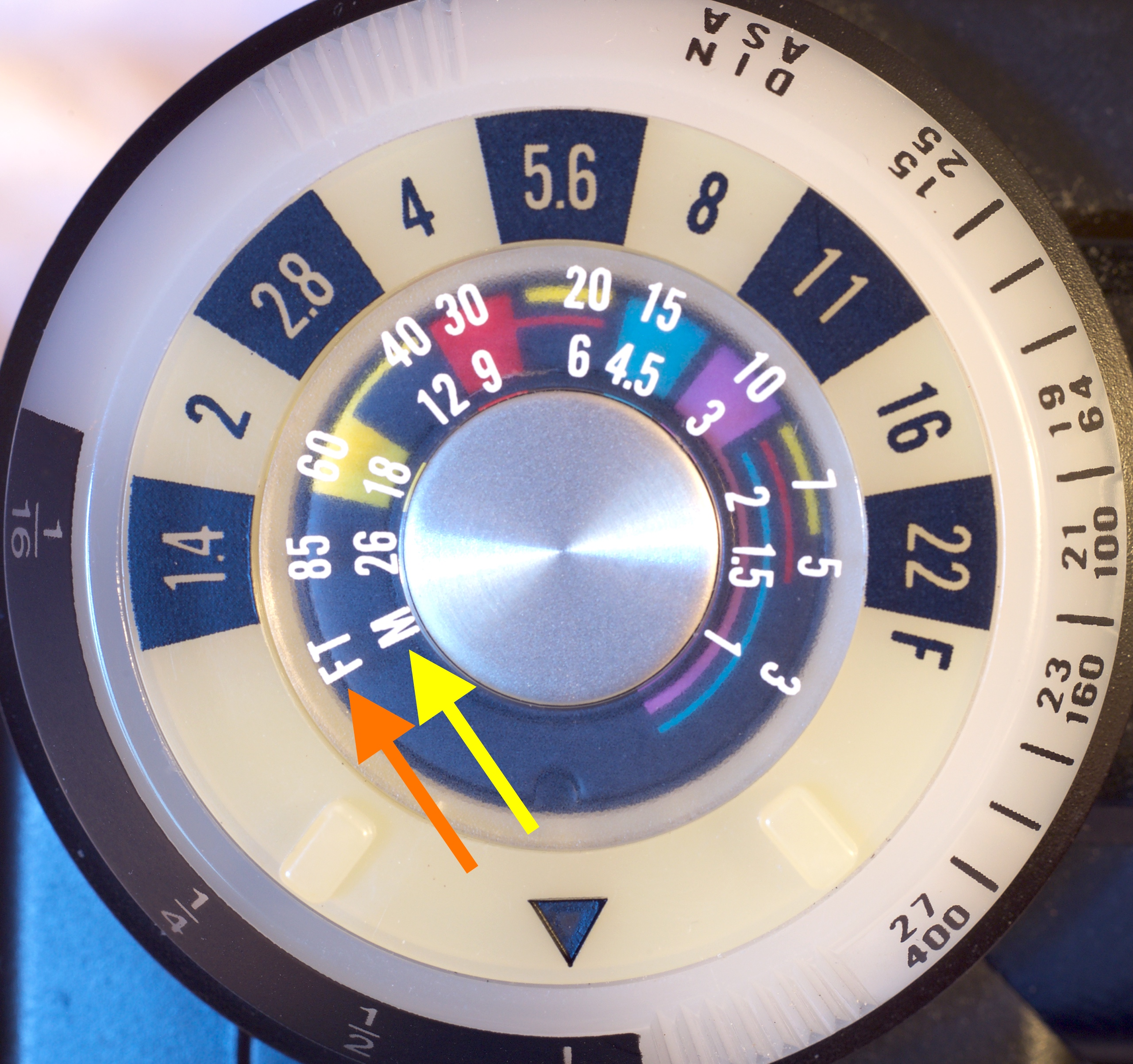
A scene will be properly illuminated for every combination of f-stop and distance shown on this flash device's exposure calculation dial, each of which equals the same guide number. The guide number here (full power setting, ISO 100, and normal-angle coverage) is 37 for calculations made in meters (yellow arrow) and 120 for feet (orange). For instance, on the foot scale, f/4 × 30 ft = 120, as do both f/8 × 15 ft and f/16 × 7.5 ft. In meters, f/1.4 × 26 m = 37 as do f/22 × 1.7 m and every combination between.

When setting photoflash exposures, the guide number (GN) of photoflash devices (flashbulbs and electronic devices known as "studio strobes", "on-camera flashes", "electronic flashes", "flashes", "speedlights", and "speedlites") is a measure photographers can use to calculate either the required f-stop for any given flash-to-subject distance, or the required distance for any given f-stop. To solve for either of these two variables, one merely divides a device's guide number by the other.

Though guide numbers are influenced by a variety of variables, their values are presented as the product of only two factors as follows:

Guide number = f-number × distance

This simple inverse relationship holds true because the brightness of a flash declines with the square of the distance, but the amount of light admitted through an aperture decreases with the square of the f-number. Accordingly, as illustrated at right, a guide number can be factored to a small f-number times a long distance just as readily as a large f-number times a short distance.

Guide numbers take into account the amount of luminous energy of the flash, the camera's ISO setting (film speed), flash coverage angle, and filters. Studio strobes in particular are often rated in watt⋅seconds, which is an absolute measure of illuminating power but is not particularly useful for calculating exposure settings. All else being equal, a guide number that is twice as great will permit subjects to be properly exposed from twice as far away or an f-number twice as great.

The guide number system, which manufacturers adopted after consistent-performing mass-produced flashbulbs became available in the late 1930s, has become nearly useless due to the ubiquity of electronic photoflash devices featuring variable flash output and automatic exposure control, as well as digital cameras, which make it trivially easy, quick, and inexpensive to adjust exposures and try again. Still, guide numbers in combination with flash devices set to manual exposure mode remain valuable in a variety of circumstances, such as when unusual or exacting results are required and when shooting non-average scenery.

Different models of flash devices available on the market have widely varying maximum-rated guide numbers. Since guide numbers are so familiar to photographers, they are near-universally used by manufacturers of on-camera flash devices to advertise their products' relative capability. However, such a practice demands industry-wide standardization of both the ISO setting and illumination angle underlying the ratings; this has only been partially realized. For the most part, manufacturers state guide numbers relative to a sensitivity of ISO 100. However, manufacturers sometimes rate guide numbers at ISO 200, which makes them 41% greater. The illumination angles underlying manufacturers' ratings vary greatly, which can make it particularly difficult to compare models.

== Understanding guide numbers ==
=== Units of measure ===
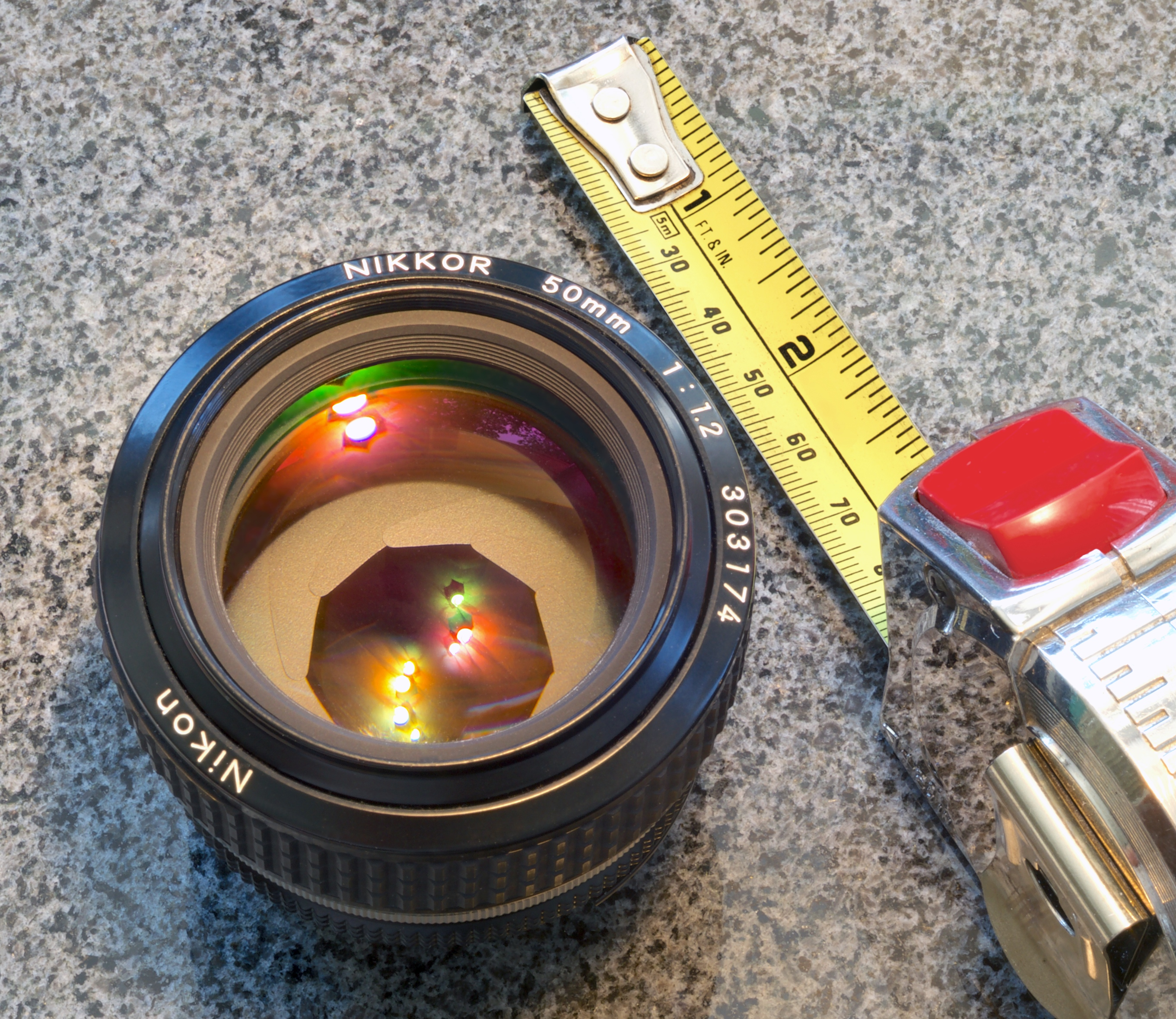
Guide numbers are a composite unit of measure comprising two factors: aperture ratio and distance. Guide numbers are expressed in units of 'f-number' times distance (i.e., meters or feet).

Throughout most of the world where the metric system (SI) is observed, guide numbers are expressed as a unitless numeric value like 34, even though they are technically a composite unit of measure that is a product of the unitless f-number and distance (in SI units of meters): f-number⋅distance [meters]. As such, guide numbers can be reduced either to distance in meters or to f-stops depending on how one uses the guide number in a calculation.

In US customary units, photographers typically measure distances in feet and require guide numbers scaled accordingly. To serve the US market, manufacturers of flash devices typically provide foot-based guide numbers and add nomenclature such as feet, ft, or the foot symbol ′ to unambiguously denote that fact, e.g. Guide number: 92'. Another common practice when flash devices are marketed in the US is to provide two guide numbers – which can be expressed in a variety of formats – so distances and f-numbers may be calculated using either feet or meters, e.g. Guide number: 30 m / 98 ft.

Though nomenclature conventions such as these can make guide numbers misleadingly appear to be length-based units of measure, they serve as notations to eliminate ambiguity as to which length-based system of measurement underlies the guide numbers.

=== Calculating with guide numbers ===
It is easy to use guide numbers to calculate either an aperture or a flash-to-subject distance. Suppose a photographer has a flash device with a guide number of 44 m (144 ft), sets the camera's aperture to f/4, and wants to know the required flash-to-subject distance; he merely divides the guide number by the f-number, 4. Thus, a subject 11 meters (36 ft) away will be correctly illuminated at 44 m (144 ft) / 4 = 11 m (36 ft). For the same guide number and an aperture of f/8, the light source must be 5.5 meters (18 ft) from the subject.

Alternatively, if one has an established flash-to-subject distance and wants to find the required f-number, one divides the guide number by the distance. For example, with a guide number GN = 48 m at 6 m, one needs an aperture of f/8: GN 48 m / 6 m = f/8.

==== Example for finding a distance ====
Suppose a photographer wants to shoot with an aperture of f/2.8 and the guide number is 28 m (92 ft). The flash device must be 10 m (33 ft) from the subject.

==== Example for finding an aperture ====
Suppose a photographer's flash-to-subject distance is 9.75 meters (32.0 ft) and the guide number is 39 m (128 ft). The aperture must be f/4: GN 39 m (128 ft) / 9.75 m (32.0 ft) = f/4.

== Details ==
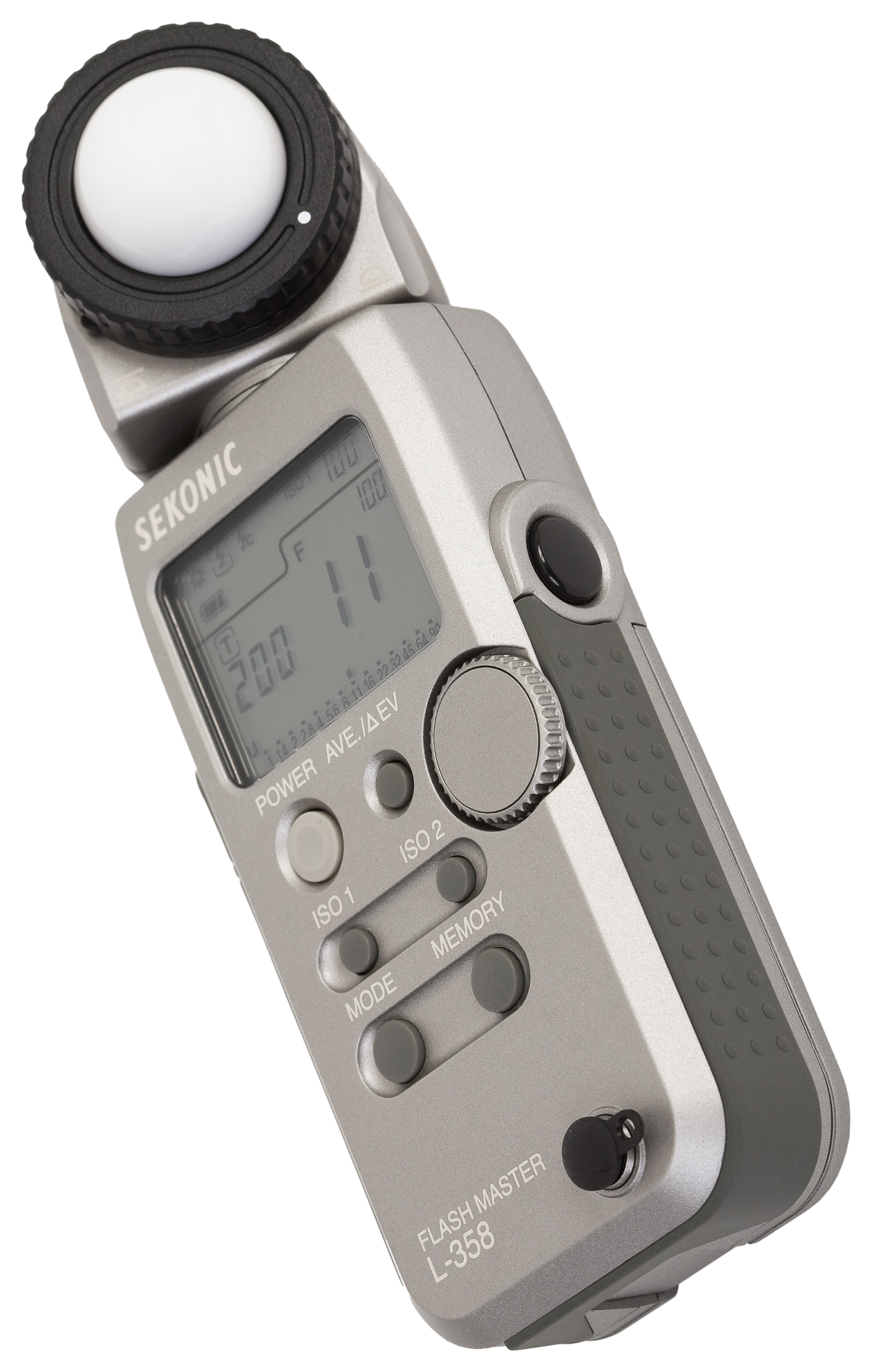
An incident-light meter measures the true luminous exposure (in lux⋅seconds) arriving at a scene.

The magnitude of guide numbers is a function of the following four variables:

1. The total luminous energy (in lumen⋅seconds) emitted by the flash head (which is itself the product of the duration and the average luminous flux of a flash).
2. The solid angle subtended by the circular- or rectangular-profile beam as it leaves the flash head (the average of the beam's horizontal and vertical angles).
3. The ISO sensitivity setting.
4. Filters (either on the flash or on the camera lens)..

The above variables fall into two classes that influence the magnitude of guide numbers:

1. Those that affect the non-distance-related intensity of a flash arriving at a scene (a property called illuminance, measured in lux or lumens per square meter) or its duration; namely its power setting, flash coverage angle, and color gels in front of the flash head.
2. Those that affect the camera's non-aperture-related light sensitivity; namely lens filters and the ISO rating of the film/imaging sensor.

Changing either the f-stop or the flash-to-subject distance does not affect guide numbers because, by definition, choosing a different value for one factor is automatically accompanied by a reciprocal adjustment in the other.

Most modern flash devices can operate at guide numbers less than their maximum ratings via either manual adjustment of their power settings in binned steps, by an in-flash automatic light sensing feature, or by being cued by the camera's sensor; both the latter options make continuously variable adjustments. Manual attenuation settings are usually steps in powers of 0.5 (full f-stops) that commonly extend five to eight f-stops deep (power levels of 1/2, 1/4, 1/8 ... 1/256). Shutter speeds do not factor into guide number calculations with electronic flash and, for the most part, have no effect on exposures.

Guide numbers are not affected by scene reflectance. Guide numbers are a function of the illuminance and duration of a flash (a property called luminous exposure that have lux⋅seconds as their units of measure) arriving at a scene as measured by an incident-light meter (pictured at right), not the amount leaving the scene. Whereas scene reflectance (the albedo of the objects being photographed) have no influence on the illuminance arriving at any given scene, reflective surfaces along the path between a flash device and a scene, such as light-colored ceilings, do have an influence. Guide numbers are often calculated by manufacturers for optimum results in average indoor settings. The built-in reflected-light meters in cameras are not a definitive measure of exposure. For example, using a camera with a through-the-lens meter to photograph a park bench surrounded by sunlit snow underexposes the image, making the bench appear nearly black and the snow as dark as grass and foliage. This is because reflected-light meters are calibrated for an average scene reflectance of 18% and do not give good results for scenes with non-average reflectance. A gray card and light meter can be used for better calibration.

Guide number distances are always measured from the flash device to the subject; if the flash device is detached from the camera, the position of the camera is irrelevant. Furthermore, unless a flash device has an automatic zoom feature that follows the setting of a camera's zoom lens, guide numbers do not vary with the focal length of lenses.

When manufacturers of flash devices provide guide numbers ratings specified relative to ISO 200, this increases them by the square root of the ratio of the two sensitivities (√2), or by about 41 percent relative to those given at ISO 100.

== Effect of power settings ==
Most modern electronic flash devices have manually adjustable power settings. Moreover, virtually all modern on-camera flash devices that have manually adjustable power settings also provide either a built-in mechanical circular calculator (such as shown in the photo at the top of this article) or a digital display that automatically shows the effect power levels have on f-stop and distance (guide number).

Nevertheless, for those who want to master the math, guide numbers diminish from their full-power ratings as the square root of their fractional setting per the following formula:
$$\text{Reduced power GN} = \text{Full power GN} \times \sqrt{ \text{Power ratio}}.$$

For example, suppose a flash's guide number is 48 m (157 ft). At 1/16 power, the reduced-power GN is $\textstyle 48 \times \sqrt{1/16} = 12\text{ [m]}$.

== Effect of flash angle (zoom setting) ==
Many flash devices have auto- or manual-adjust zoom features that permit the illumination angle to be widened (lessening the guide number) to fully illuminate the image area of wide-angle lenses, or narrowed (increasing the guide number) for telephoto lenses. Such coverage angles may be given in degrees but are often expressed as being equivalent to lens focal lengths for full-frame, 35 mm cameras. Manufacturer advertising practices vary as to the angle of coverage underlying their guide number ratings, in large part because some flash devices can be zoomed whereas others are fixed.

Virtually all modern on-camera flash devices with zoomable flash heads also have either a built-in mechanical circular calculator (such as shown in the photo at the top of this article) or a digital display; both automatically show the effect zoom levels have on f-stop and distance (guide number).

The optics of flash heads are complex; each manufacture's designs not only have illumination areas that are slightly different, but are the product of differing relative proportions of transmission, diffusion, reflection, and refraction among their optical elements (flash tube, reflector, Fresnel lens, and add-on wide-angle adapter). Accordingly, there is no universal formula for precisely calculating how guide numbers diminish from, for instance, a 105 mm setting to 50 mm or 35 mm settings.

The below table illustrates the variation in guide numbers depending on zoom level for some select, relatively high-power zoom-capable flash devices.

Variation in decay of guide number versus flash angle (normalized to 105 mm) with selected zoom-capable flash devices (in pct., %)
Flash angle (Note: Flash angle is equivalent to the denoted lens focal length for a full-frame 35 mm camera.)	Vivitar 285	Sony HVL-F58AM	Yongnuo YN-568EX	Canon 430EX III-RT	Nikon SB-900	Metz 58 AF-2	Median value
105 mm	100	100	100	100	100	100	100
50 mm	85.7	72.4	72.4	76.8	80.7	72.4	74
35 mm	71.4	62.1	67.2	65.1	68.4	60.3	66
28 mm	50.0	53.4	51.7	55.8	60.6	53.4	53

== Effect of ISO sensitivity ==
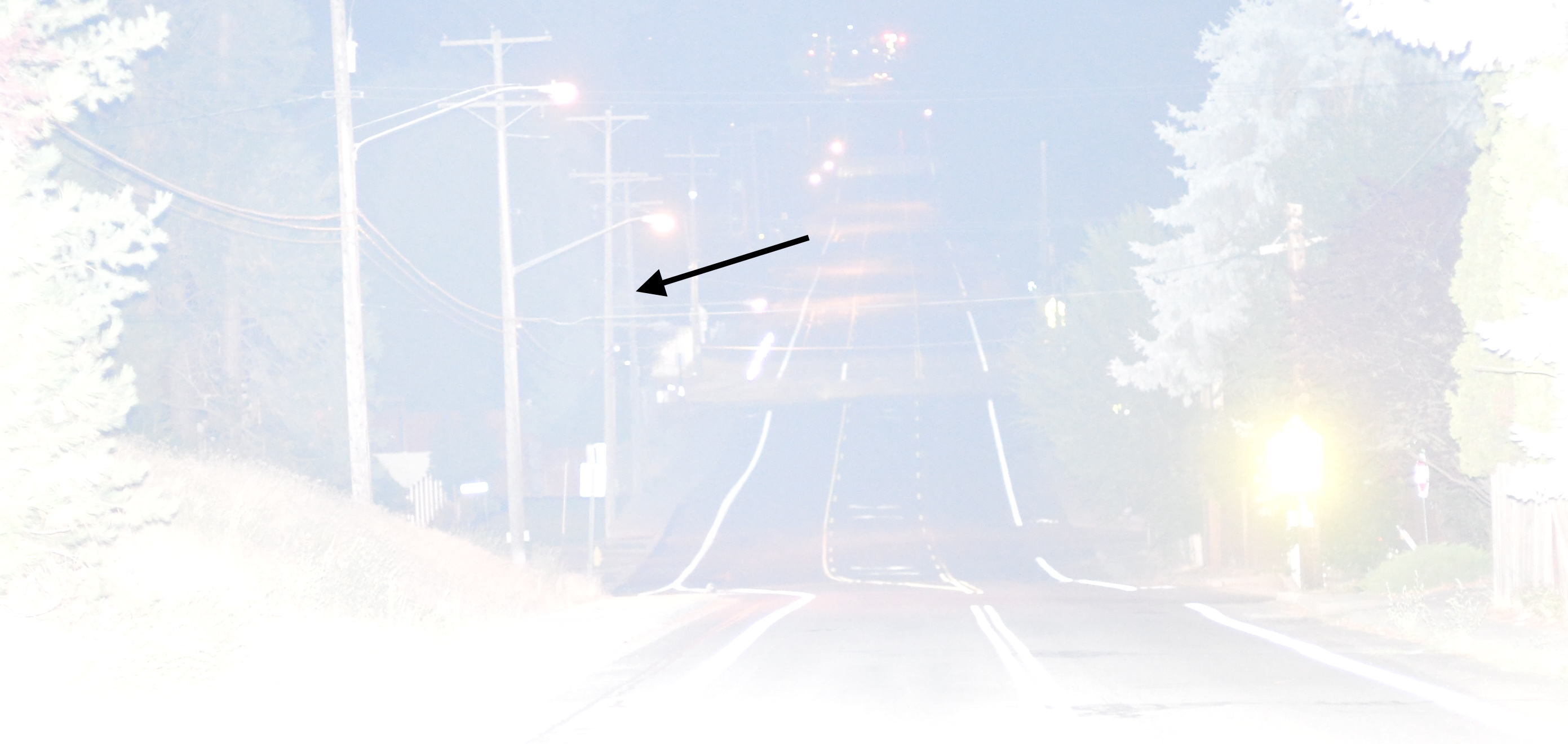
Particulates and aerosols typically present in outside air limit the extent to which high guide numbers created by high ISO sensitivities can be used to illuminate scenes at long distances. This photo was shot in fair quality air at ISO 12,800 using a modestly powerful camera-mounted flash, yielding a high guide number of 438 m (1,437 ft). When shot at f/1.8 to favor distance, the utility pole marked by the arrow would be properly illuminated were it not for haze glare, which fogged the image and diminished brightness.

Among other variables like illumination angle (for devices with zoomable flash heads) and power setting, guide numbers are a function of the ISO sensitivity (film speed or ISO setting on a digital camera). Guide numbers change as the square root of the ratio of the ISO sensitivities; for example, quadrupling the ISO setting doubles the guide number. Accordingly, a greater ISO sensitivity yields a greater guide number.

To allow photographers to properly calculate exposures, even older, base-model flash devices have at least a tabular table on the device showing its guide number for a limited range of common ISO sensitivities. Today, the state of the art has advanced so that with the exception of the least expensive models, virtually all modern on-camera flash devices feature either a built-in mechanical circular calculator (such as shown in the photo at the top of this article) or a digital display; both methods automatically calculate the effect ISO settings have on f-stop and distance (guide number). Such features make it simple to find a suitable combination of f-stop and distance.

Still, it can be helpful when comparing flash devices to understand how guide numbers vary with ISO sensitivity. Usually manufacturers state their products' guide number ratings relative to an ISO sensitivity of 100. However, some manufacturers of flash devices may provide guide numbers ratings specified relative to ISO 200, which increases its guide number by 41 percent relative to those given at ISO 100.

The below table shows the proportional change in a flash device's guide number relative to both ISO 100 and ISO 200.

The extremely high guide numbers shown in the right-hand portion of the table have a limited real-world ability to extend flash distances. As the above photo illustrates, the f-number × distance reciprocal relationship breaks down when on-camera flash devices that are set to full or near-full power are used in combination with cameras set to very high ISO sensitivities and large apertures (exceedingly long distances). ISO settings like 102,400 can yield guide numbers in excess of 120 m (400 ft) that seldom if ever permit extremely long-range flash photography due to particulates and aerosols typically present in outside air that fog images with haze glare and attenuate the reach of the light. Except in unusual atmospheric conditions, extraordinarily large guide numbers will produce suitable results only by either positioning the flash device off-axis from the camera by a fair distance or by shooting at the smallest apertures.

Change in guide numbers as ISO sensitivity varies from an advertised rating
ISO sensitivity (Note: The ISO sensitivities shown in this table are their common nomenclature values; their actual underlying values may be slightly different, such as ISO 250, which is actually approximately 252.)	32	40	50	64	80	100	125	160	200	250	320	400	500	640	800	1600	3200	6400	12,800	25,600	51,200	102,400	204,800	409,600
Proportional change in GN relative to ISO 100	0.561	0.630	0.707	0.794	0.891	1.00	1.12	1.26	1.41	1.59	1.78	2.00	2.24	2.52	2.83	4.00	5.66	8.00	11.3	16.0	22.6	32.0	45.3	64.0
Proportional change in GN relative to ISO 200	0.397	0.445	0.500	0.561	0.630	0.707	0.794	0.891	1.00	1.12	1.26	1.41	1.59	1.78	2.00	2.83	4.00	5.66	8.00	11.3	16.0	22.6	32.0	45.3

== Effect of filters ==
Filters reduce guide numbers regardless of whether they are gels placed over the flash device or are lens filters on the camera. Flash devices may come with detachable color-correction gels or filters to match the color of the flash with different types of ambient lighting such as incandescent and fluorescent. Some modern flash devices can even detect when color-correction gels have been attached and automatically compensate for their effect on guide numbers.

Unless a hot shoe-mounted electronic flash device's power can be controlled by a camera via through-the-lens metering (TTL), guide numbers must be manually compensated for the effect of on-lens filters. Even with TTL, non-average scenery such as off-center subjects with distant backgrounds or scenery with elements that have non-average reflectance can confound TTL metering. However, such situations cannot confound guide number equations. For instance, a typical polarizing filter, which attenuates 1–1.5 stops, will diminish guide numbers to 71–60% of their unfiltered rating.

Attenuation of guide numbers with filter loss
Filter f-stop	Factor
1/3	89.1%
1/2	84.1%
2/3	79.4%
1	70.7%
1 1/3	63.0%
1 1/2	59.5%
1 2/3	56.1%
2	50.0%
2 1/3	44.5%
2 1/2	42.0%
2 2/3	39.7%
3	35.4%

Guide numbers diminish in proportion to the square root of the fraction of light that the filter transmits, a fraction that halves with each stop of attenuation, as per the following formula:
$$\text{Filtered GN} = \text{GN} \times \sqrt{0.5^{n}}$$

where $n$ is the filter's rated loss in stops.

The table to the right provides some common filter values.

When a flash device is set to manual (M) or automatic (A) exposure mode and is not being controlled via the camera's through-the-lens metering, a convenient way to compensate for the effect of a lens-mounted filter is to set the ISO rating on a camera to a higher value than the flash device. For instance, if a polarizing filter attenuates by 1 stop and the flash device is set to ISO 100, then the camera can simply be set to ISO 200. The extra camera sensitivity compensates for the loss due to the filter.

The formula governing this relationship is as follows:
$$\text{Camera ISO} = \text{Flash ISO} \times 2^{n}$$

where $n$ is the camera filter's rated loss in stops.

For example, suppose a filter attenuates by 1 1/3 stops and the flash device is set to ISO 100. Then the filter factor n = 4/3, so the camera ISO should be set to 2^{4/3} ≈ 2.5198 times the flash ISO of 100, or about 252. The nearest standard camera setting is ISO 250.

== Effect of shutter speeds ==
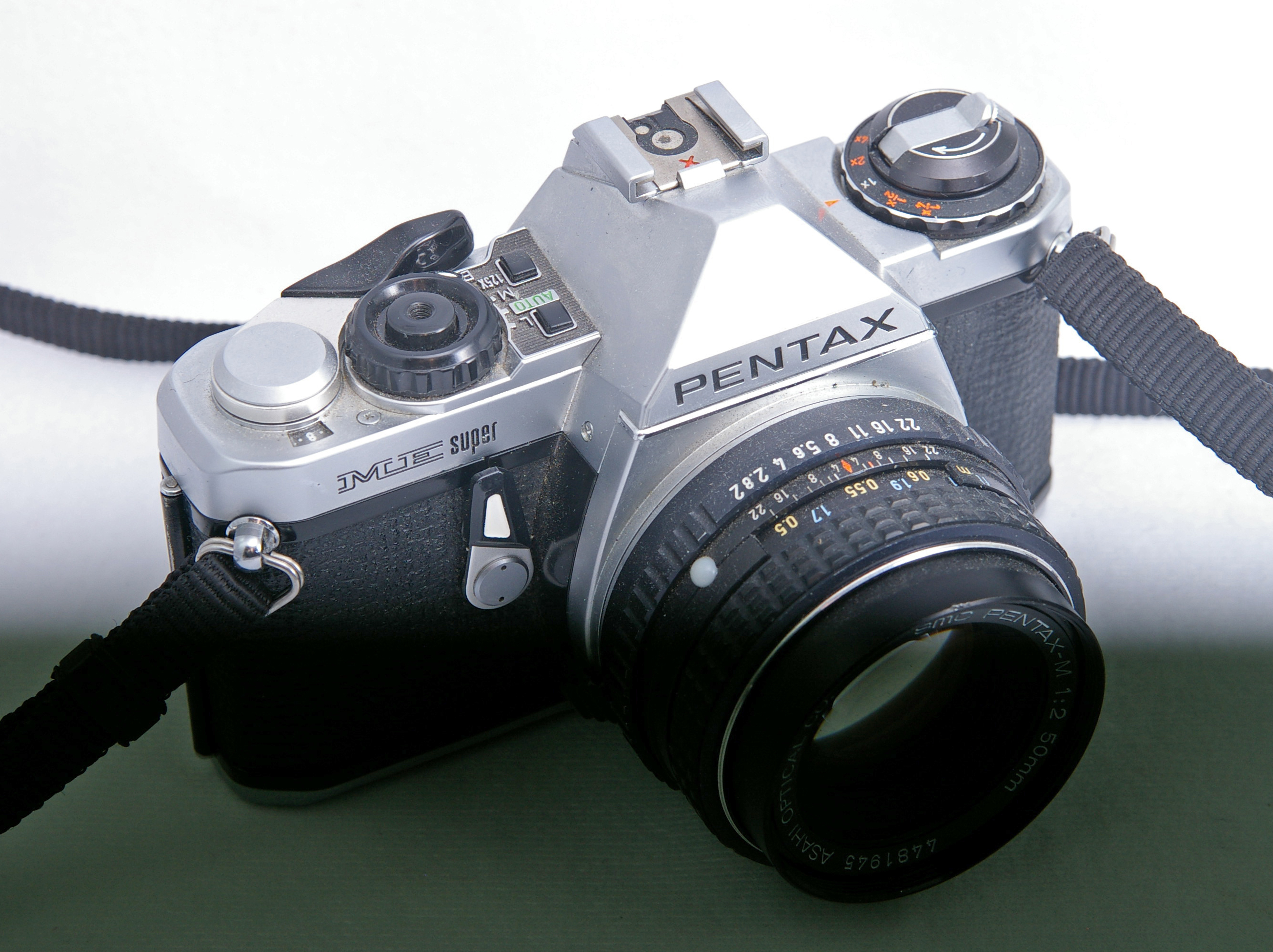
With focal-plane shutters, exposures faster than the X-sync speed can cause the image area to be partially obscured by the closing curtain during the flash.

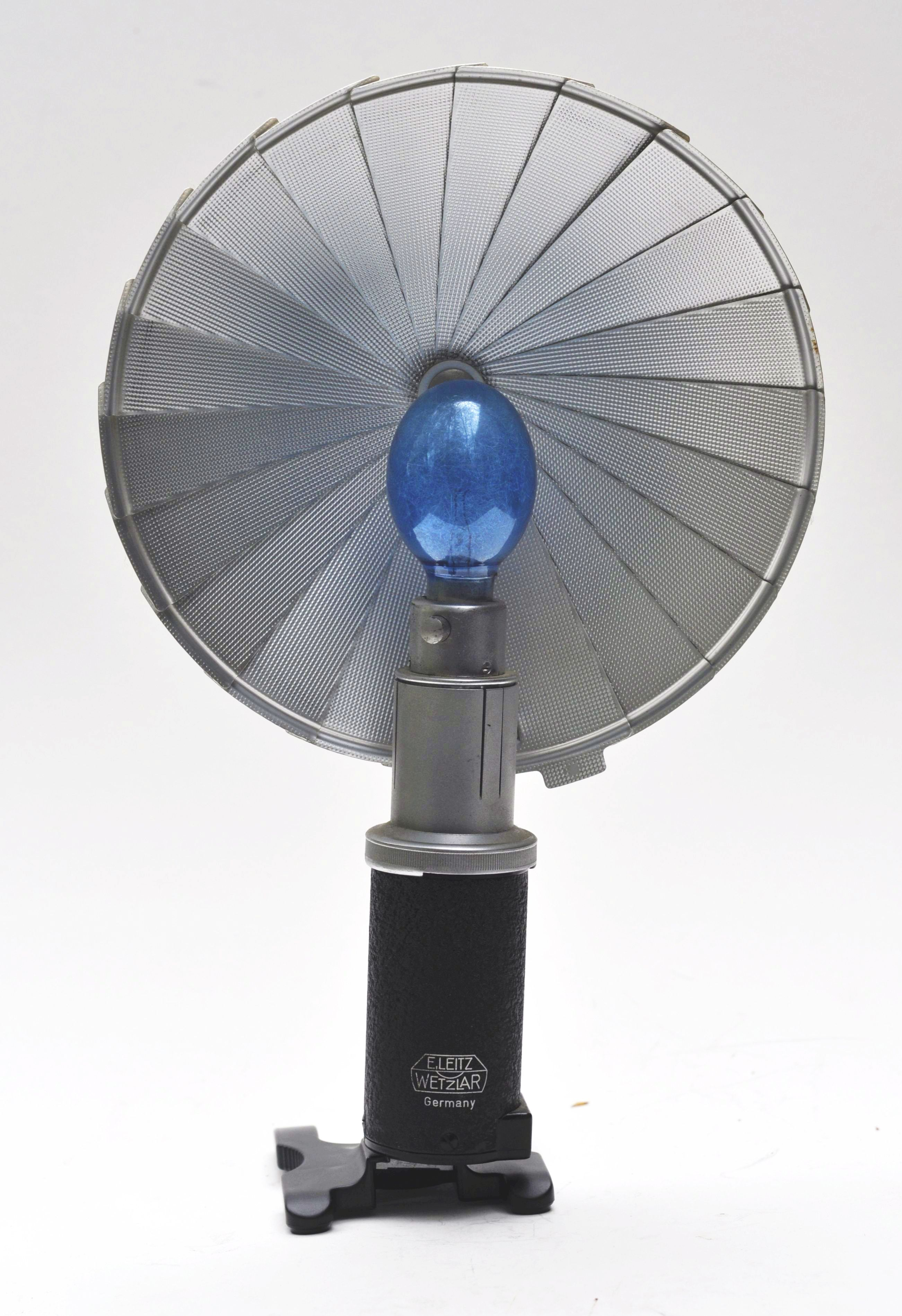
A Leica "CEYOO"-model flashgun with folding reflector (1950–1959), which accepted "Midget" No. 5 flashbulbs. The blue coating (type 5B) permitted use with color film.

The output of the GE Synchro-Press No. 11 flashbulb, showing luminous flux with respect to time. Like all Class M (medium peak) bulbs, its peak output was defined as occurring 20 milliseconds after applying electrical current. The No. 11 had a peak luminous flux of 1.8 million lumens. Its rated luminous energy, Q_{v} of 23,000 lumen⋅seconds is the shaded area to the right of the definitional shutter opening point (1/800 of a second before the point of peak luminous flux).

=== With electronic flash ===
When electronic flash devices based on flashtube technology are used with most modern cameras (those with focal-plane shutters), shutter speed has no effect on guide numbers. (A notable exception is when a flash device at full power is used in combination with cameras equipped with leaf shutters set to very brief exposure times.)

This is because even at the most powerful settings, flash durations seldom exceed a few milliseconds (thousandths of a second). With focal-plane shutters, a flash begins shortly after the shutter curtain has fully opened and must extinguish before the curtain begins to close. Selecting any shutter speed faster than the camera's rated X-sync speed, which is often between 1/60 and 1/200 of a second (from as long as 16.7 ms to as little as 5.0 ms) causes the shutter curtain to begin wiping closed across the film or sensor before the flash has extinguished. When this happens, an underexposed, gradated band appears along an edge of the image—often trailing off darker towards the left or bottom, as seen in the photo at top right.

Conversely, longer exposures also have no effect on guide number. After the flash has extinguished, longer shutter speeds will only increase the contribution from continuous ambient light, which can lead to ghosting with moving subjects.

=== With flashbulbs ===
Shutter speeds influence guide numbers when using flashbulbs due to their relatively long flash durations. Vintage flashbulbs, though no longer made, are still available and have a niche following, largely because even medium-size bulbs such as the once-popular General Electric Synchro-Press No. 11 had huge light outputs on the order of 23,000 lumen⋅seconds – far exceeding the most powerful of today's hot shoe-mounted electronic flash devices. At a relatively slow shutter speed of 1 /25 of a second (40 ms), the GE No. 11 had a guide number of 97.5 m (320 ft) at ISO 100 when using a typical 6-or-7-inch (150 or 180 mm) polished reflector. With peak powers often between one and two million lumens, many young baby boomers chased after fairy-like retinal bleached spots (a symptom of flash blindness) for minutes after having their pictures taken at close distance with flashbulbs of the era.

If one wanted the benefit of all the light produced by a flashbulb (highest possible guide number), relatively long exposure times were required because most flashbulbs did not stop producing useful amounts of light until 20–90 ms after electrical current was applied. The GE No. 11 flashbulb for instance, was a Class M (medium peak) bulb, which were designed to produce peak luminous flux of 20 ms after firing (see the graph at lower right). The No. 11 was intended for leaf shutter-type cameras and M sync photoflash triggering, which gave M bulbs a head start by delaying the opening of the shutter so any given camera's fastest exposure time would be centered at the 20 ms point (an 18.75 ms delay for instance, for a definitional camera capable of 1/400 second exposures, or 2.5 ms).

The GE No. 11 stopped producing useful amounts of light roughly 50 ms after current was applied. Thus, a camera with a fastest shutter speed of 1/400 of a second (one that began exposures 18.75 ms after a bulb was fired with M sync triggering), and which was set to 1/25 of a second, would close its shutter 59 ms after triggering a flashbulb (18.75 ms + 40 ms = 58.75 ms) and would achieve the maximum rated guide number from the No. 11.

So long as one used flashbulbs with leaf shutter-type cameras, faster exposures and larger apertures could be used to minimize motion blur or reduce depth of field at the expense of guide number. In the case of the GE Synchro-Press No. 11 with M sync for instance, shutter speeds as long as 1/50 of a second still diminished its guide number, though it still managed an impressive 43 m (140 ft) at a 1/400 second exposure. This relationship between shutter speed and guide number was reflected in the guide number tables printed on flashbulb packaging after the industry-wide adoption of the guide number system, as exemplified by the below-left table for the No. 11.

Effect of shutter speed on guide number for the GE Synchro-Press #11 flashbulb (6- or 7-in polished relfector, M sync, ISO 100)
Shutter speed (s)	Guide number
≥1/25	98 m (320 ft)
1/50	79 m (260 ft)
1/100	76 m (250 ft)
1/200	58 m (190 ft)
1/400	43 m (140 ft)

Cameras with focal-plane shutters – even if they had PC connectors with X, F, M, or S-sync delays ("xenon sync" with zero delay and flashbulbs with peak delays of 5, 20, and 30 ms)[[{{{first}}} {{{last}}}]] could not be used at speeds that attenuated guide numbers with most types of flashbulbs because their light curves were characterized by rapid rise and fall rates; the second shutter curtain would begin wiping shut during a period of rapid change in scene illuminance, causing uneven exposure across the image area that varied in nature depending on exposure duration and the type of bulb. With the GE Synchro-Press No. 11 for instance, a modern camera with a focal-plane shutter and X sync would require a shutter speed of 1/15 of a second (67 ms) to obtain an even exposure across the entire image area—and a not-insignificant boost in the guide number by capturing all the luminous energy to the left of the 20 ms peak.

A notable exception to this limitation with focal-plane shutters was when using FP sync in combination with "flat peak" (FP) bulbs, which had 19–20 ms rise times followed by broad, relatively level plateaus in their light output curves. The FP bulbs, like the GE No. 6, allowed extraordinary flexibility with shutter speeds, ranging from the slowest speeds on the dial to the fastest where only a narrow slit passed over the film, at the expense of guide number.

== History ==
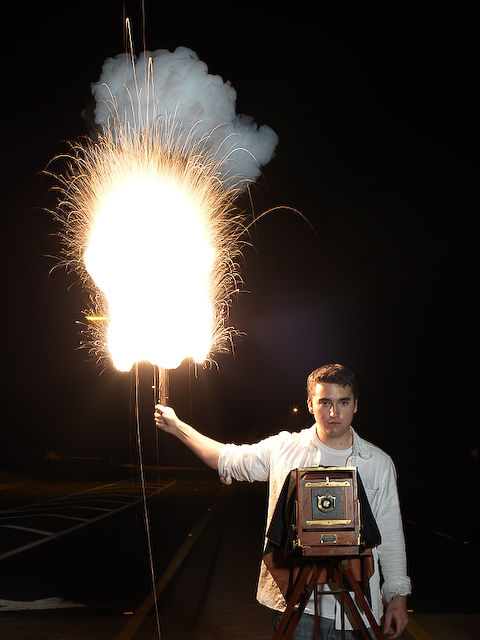
Before the introduction of flashbulbs, photographers used magnesium flash powder in a flash-lamp. The pneumatic shutter release cords of the era featured rubber bulbs the photographer squeezed to take a photograph.

General Electric introduced the guide number system in 1939 concurrently with the introduction of a compact, wire-filled flashbulb called the No. 5. This compelling new way of easily and accurately calculating photoflash exposures was quickly adopted by manufacturers of a wide variety of photographic equipment, including flashbulbs, film, cameras, and flashguns.

The first flashbulb was introduced in 1925 and was filled with flash powder. In 1929, Sashalite Limited in London invented the "Sashalite" flashbulb, which was filled with a crumpled wad of aluminum foil so thin (about one-tenth the width of a human hair) it could not be picked up with fingers.

Prior to GE's inverse of the squares innovation, photographers and publications—via tedious trial and error with different flashbulbs and reflectors—generated tables providing a large number of aperture-distance combinations. For instance, a 1940 edition (written too late to incorporate guide numbers) of the Complete Introduction to Photography by the Journal of the Photographic Society of America featured an exposure table for foil-filled flashbulbs, which is shown below. The parenthetical values in bold were not part of the original table; they show the equivalent guide number for each aperture-distance combination. The original table used the common nomenclature values for the apertures; the guide numbers shown here are based on the precise aperture values from the ${\sqrt{2}}^{\ n}$ series. Note the scatter in the guide number values in each column; the data for the right-most flashbulb setup has over a three-quarter f-stop variation from high to low.

1940 exposure experiment with foil-filled flashbulbs
Distance (in feet)	Small bulb in metal reflector		Large bulb in metal reflector		Small bulb in ordinary reflector		Large bulb in ordinary reflector	
Distance (in feet)	f/#	GN	f/#	GN	f/#	GN	f/#	GN
1.8 m (6 ft)	f/22	41 m 136 ft	f/32	59 m 192 ft	f/16	29 m 96 ft	f/22	41 m 136 ft
3.0 m (10 ft)	f/16	49 m 160 ft	f/22	69 m 226 ft	f/11	34 m 113 ft	f/16	49 m 160 ft
4.6 m (15 ft)	f/11	52 m 170 ft	f/16	73 m 240 ft	f/6.3	29 m 95 ft	f/11	52 m 170 ft
6.1 m (20 ft)	f/6.3	39 m 127 ft	f/11	69 m 226 ft	f/4.5	27 m 90 ft	f/6.3	39 m 127 ft

The above table is for only one film speed. For end users, obtaining proper exposures with flashbulbs was an error-prone effort as they mentally interpolated between distances and f-stop combinations that weren't very accurate in the first place. Had the guide number system existed by this point, the above table would not have required the left-most column showing distances and would have required only one row (showing guide numbers) under each heading.

By 1941, two years after GE introduced the guide number system, guide number ratings for products like the GE No. 11 were being discussed in books like Flash in Modern Photography. By 1944, the 16th edition of Wall's Dictionary of Photography featured a guide number table. Perhaps so as to not intimidate readers, that table still showed numerous combinations of distances and apertures, but it also featured a new column showing the guide number that every cell in its row equalled. The guide number system underlying that table drove slightly finer increases, averaging a factor of $\sqrt{2}$ each, from one distance to the next (6, 9, 12, 18, and 24 feet) so each step would be accompanied – by definition – by an increase in aperture of precisely one f-stop. Not surprisingly, the data scatter was as tight as mathematical rounding to the nearest foot permitted.

By late 1949, authors catering to hobbyists were using guide numbers in articles in a routine fashion, as exemplified by the January 1950 issue of Popular Photography, as follows:

The system I use is to decide upon lens opening (as demanded by depth of field) and, working with the guide number of the bulb, figure out how far the flash should be from the subject.

Upon introducing the new inverse of the squares concept in 1939, General Electric initially referred to the new system as "Flash Numbers". Two years later, Flash in Modern Photography (1941) used the term "guide number" on page 47, on the very next page used the term "Flash Number" (title case), and later still used the term "flash number" (lowercase). Terminology was similarly mixed in the UK for years after the introduction of the guide number system; circa 1954, "Flash Factor", "Flash number" (and sometimes "Guide number") were in use.

== See also ==
- Exposure (photography)
- Exposure value
- Flash comparison
- Flash (photography)
- Flash synchronization
- Flashtube
