= Ron St. Angelo =

American photographer

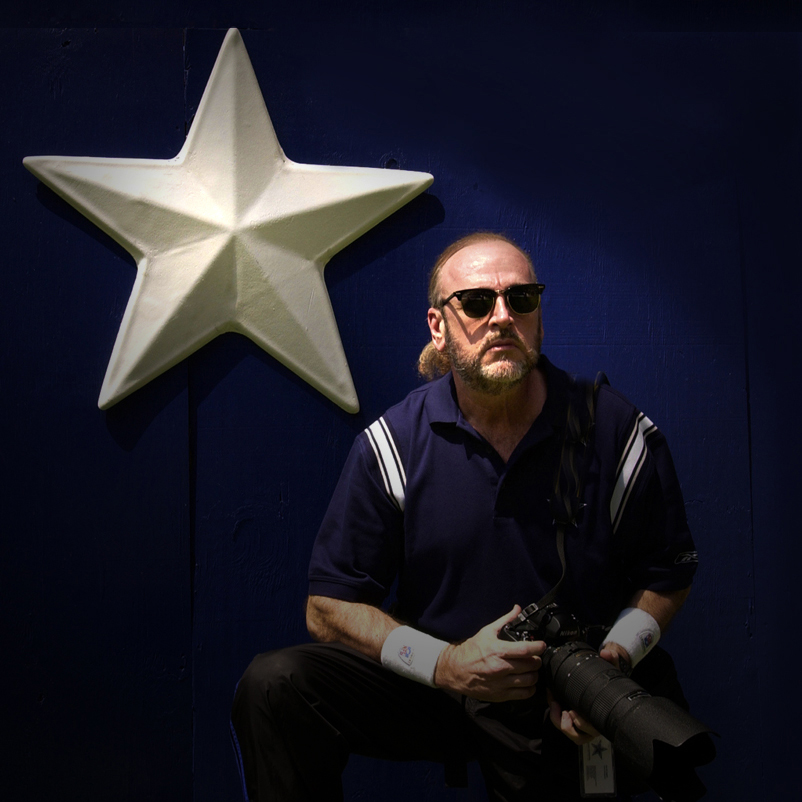
- St. Angelo in 2003
- Born: Ron St. Angelo; December 29, 1948 (age 77); Beaumont, Texas
- Occupation: Photographer
- Years active: 55
- Known for: Sports photography
- Notable work: "Triplets"
- Military career
- Allegiance: United States
- Branch: United States Navy
- Service years: 1967–1973
- Rank: Boatswain 3rd Class
- Unit: USS Brinkley Bass (DD-887)
- Conflicts: Vietnam War
- Awards: National Defense Service Medal; Vietnam Service Medal 3 Campaigns; Republic of Vietnam Campaign Medal; Vietnam Gallantry Cross with Palm
- Website: http://www.ronstangelo.com/

Ron St. Angelo (born 1948) is an American photographer. From 1979 until 2010, St. Angelo served as the official photographer of the Dallas Cowboys. He is best known for his photographs of athletes, including Emmitt Smith, Troy Aikman, and Michael Irvin, who are pictured together in his best-known work, dubbed "Triplets." He has published several books, including Greatest Team Ever.

== Early life ==
Born in Beaumont, Texas, Ron St. Angelo took interest in photography from a young age. He helped start the photography department at Beaumont High School in 1965, constructing a lab and darkroom to process film and print black-and-white prints.

Upon graduating in 1967, St. Angelo enlisted in the United States Navy. St. Angelo served two combat tours of duty in Vietnam as Boatswain's Mate stationed on a Man-O-War U.S. Destroyer based out of Naval Station Long Beach, California. During his service, he was exposed to Agent Orange, which left him "100% disabled" later in life. After an honorable discharge from military service in 1973, St. Angelo returned to his studies at the University of Houston.

During this time, he began working for a portrait studio with locations in Houston and Dallas, where he was mentored by the company's senior photographer. In 1978, he opened his own professional photography studio, St. Angelo Photography.

== Career ==
In 1979, the Dallas Cowboys hired St. Angelo as their official photographer. In this role, he provided coverage of the Dallas Cowboys Cheerleaders, to game action, coaches, and front office officials.

His tenure as the Cowboys' photographer overlapped with the team's "dynasty" period, in which they won three Super Bowls in four years. Most notably, Emmitt Smith, Troy Aikman, and Michael Irvin were drafted during this period. A photograph of the three future Hall of Famers taken by St. Angelo is the most famous photo in the team's history. In 2002, he was nominated for a Pulitzer Prize in photojournalism for his photograph of Emmitt Smith breaking the rushing record; he was not selected as a finalist.

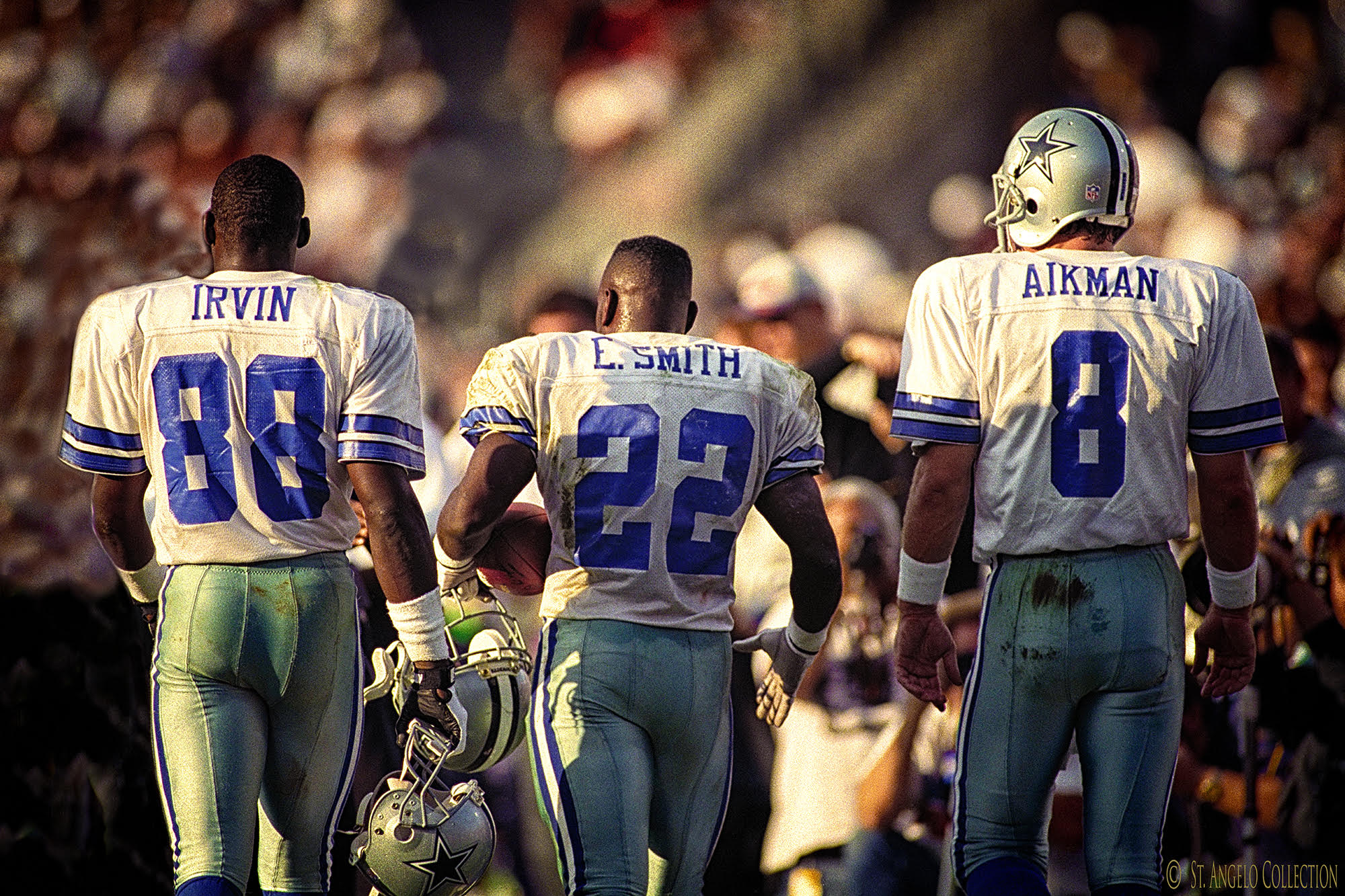
St. Angelo's "Triplets," one of the most famous photos of the Dallas Cowboys.

St. Angelo began to withdraw from sports photography as the job became too physically demanding with age. After his retirement in 2010, St. Angelo donated around 700 photographs to the NFL Hall of Fame Archives.

In 1989 the Professional Photographers Association of China invited him to present his work, and he earned a Master of Photography. In 2002, he received a nomination for a Pulitzer Prize in Journalism. In 2004, Nikon Camera honored him for his work and featured him in their Legends Behind the Lens.

In 2009 he worked for the Roman Catholic diocese of Dallas, publishing four books over the course of 12 years, including Kevin Joseph Cardinal Farrell and the Cathedral Shrine of the Virgin of Guadalupe in 2011. In 2021, he donated a collection of photographs to the Diocese. A collection of his work was inducted into the Dallas Historical Society.

== Exhibitions ==
St. Angelo's photographs are on permanent exhibit at AT&T Stadium, Arlington, Texas, home of the Dallas Cowboys. His work was exhibited at Cathedral Guadalupe on the publication of his book, Dallas, Texas. His work was exhibited at Eastman Kodak's Corporate Headquarters in Las Colinas, Texas. Goodrich Gallery Presents Ron St. Angelo One-Man Show / February 1991. He had a one-man show at the Club Corp Country Club in Irving, Texas in 2019. One man show Stage West Theatre Fort Worth, Texas 2013. The White House, Washington D.C. 2005. ESPN Headquarters Las Colinas, Texas 2012.

== Awards ==
- 1989: Master of Photography, Art Institute of Dallas
- 1991: Board Ten Thousand Eyes Project / 150th Anniversary of Photography Eastman Kodak
- 2002: The National Academy of Television Arts & Sciences / Lone Star Chapter / Sports Emmy Documentary on Official Photographer Dallas Cowboys
- 2004: Nikon Camera / Legends Behind the Lens
- 2009: St. Angelo Signature Collection Dallas Cowboys Football Club

== Personal ==
St. Angelo is married to Joanna St. Angelo, executive director of the Sammons Center for the Performing Arts. He is a devout Catholic.

== Gallery ==
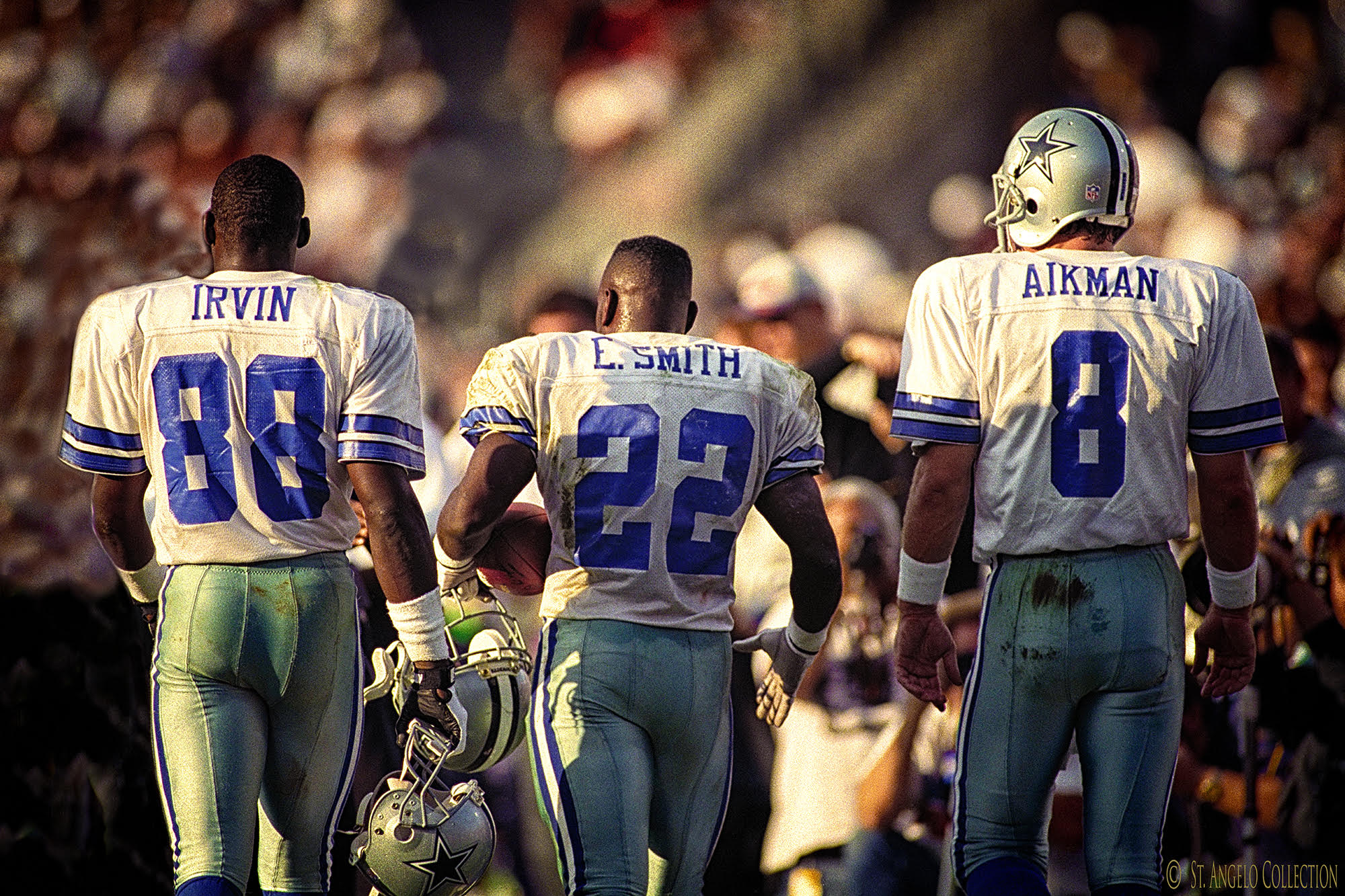

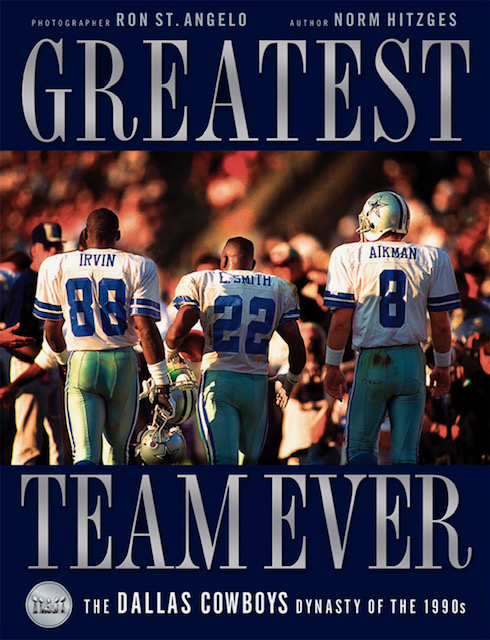

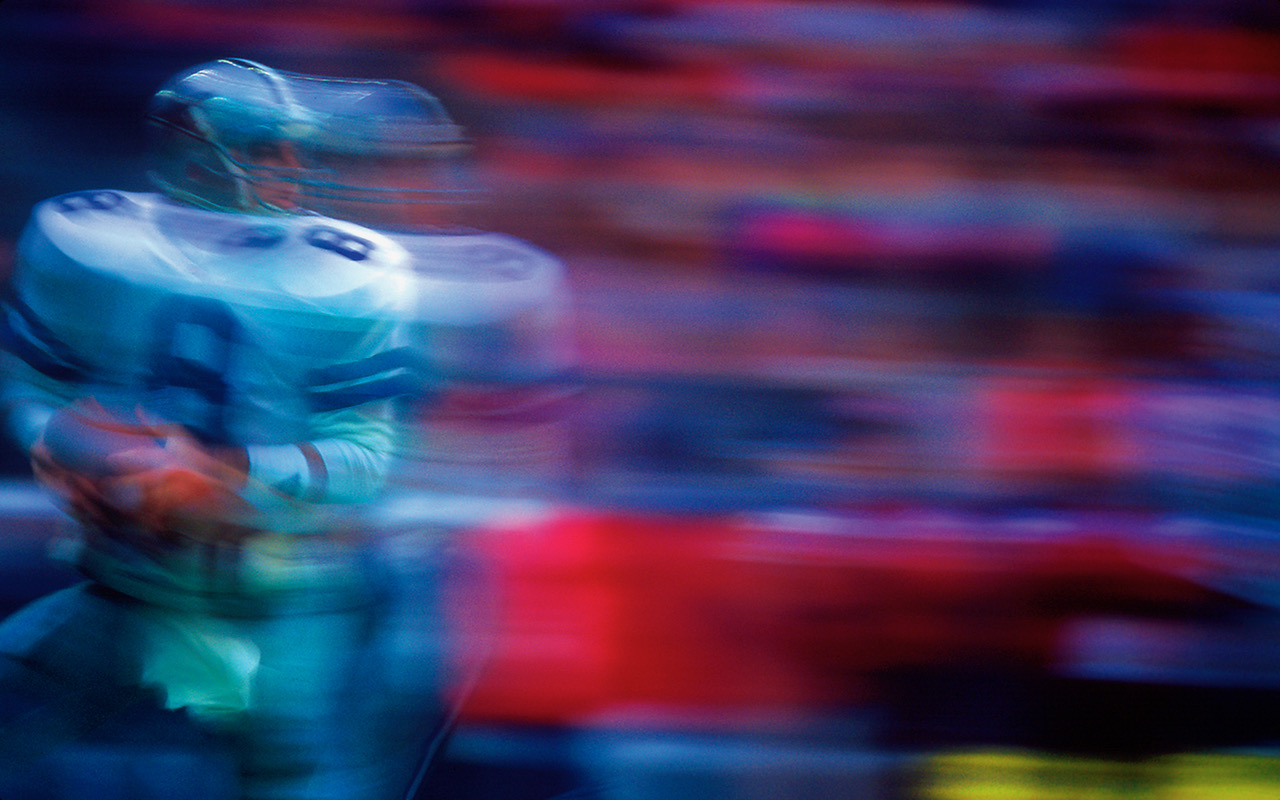

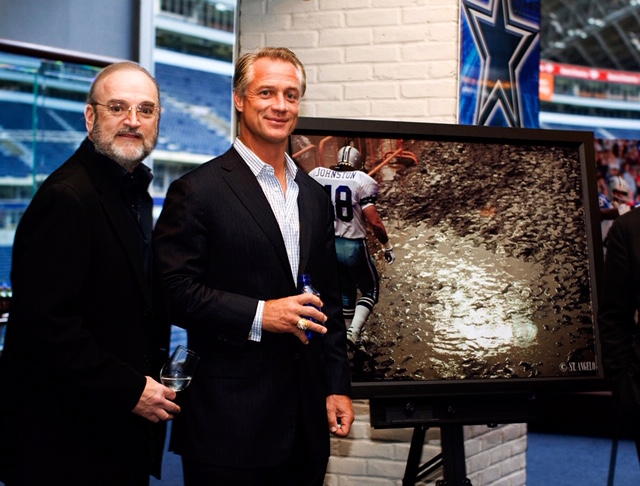

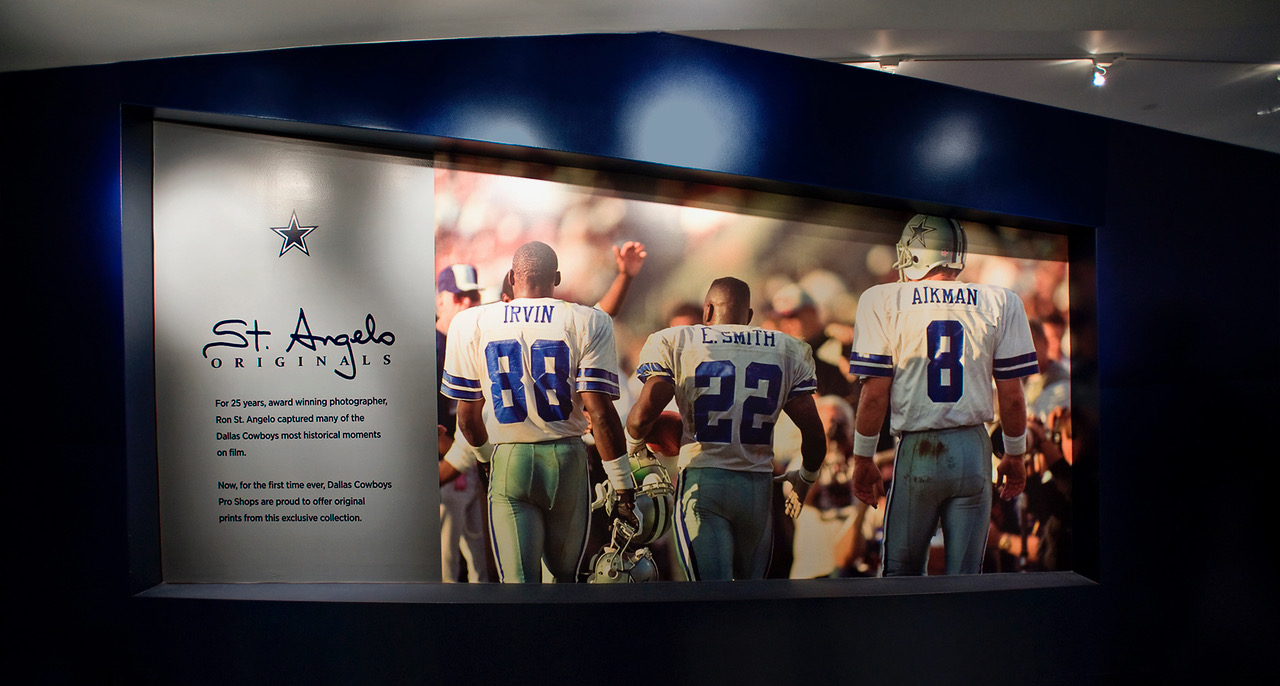

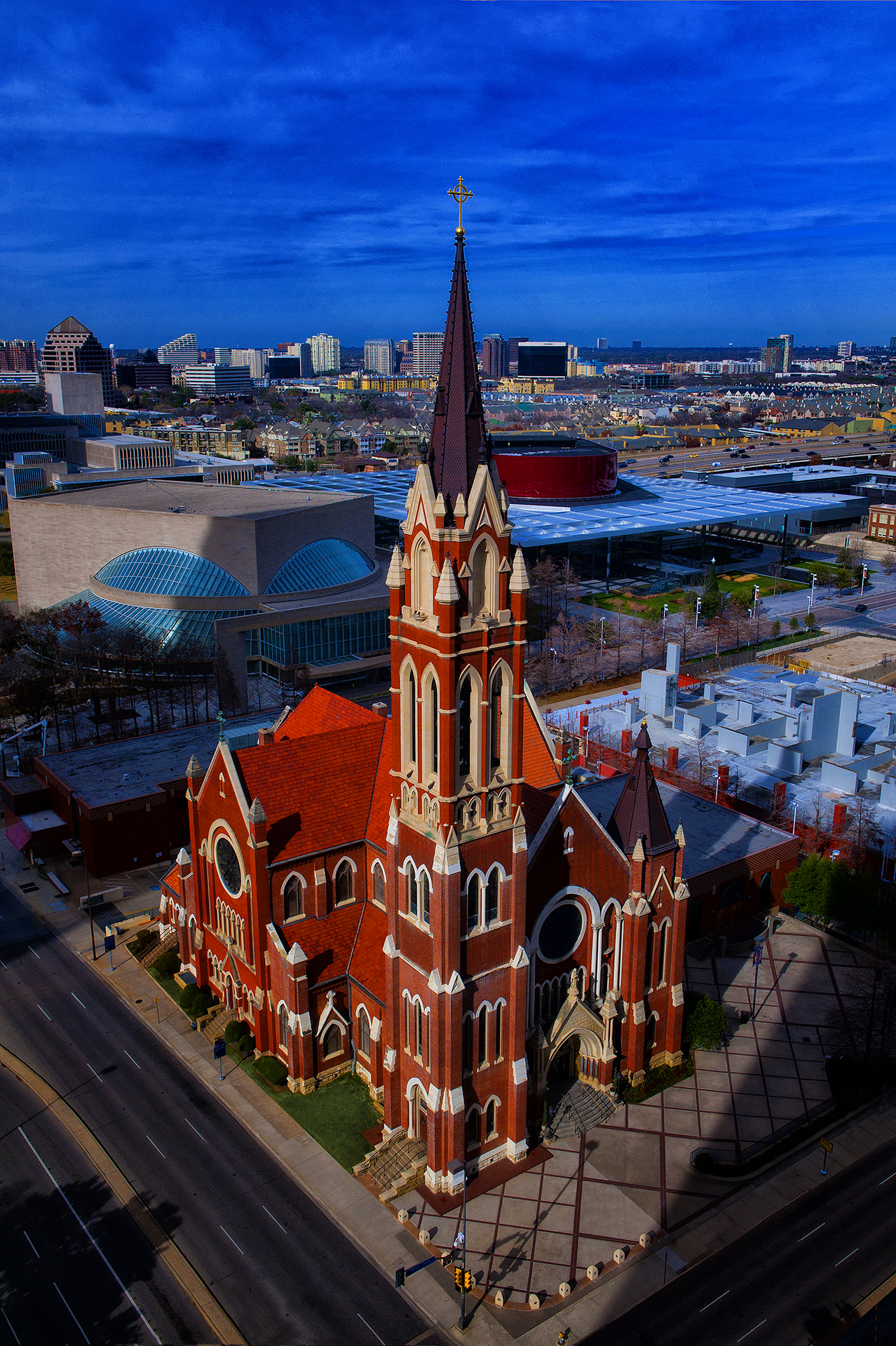

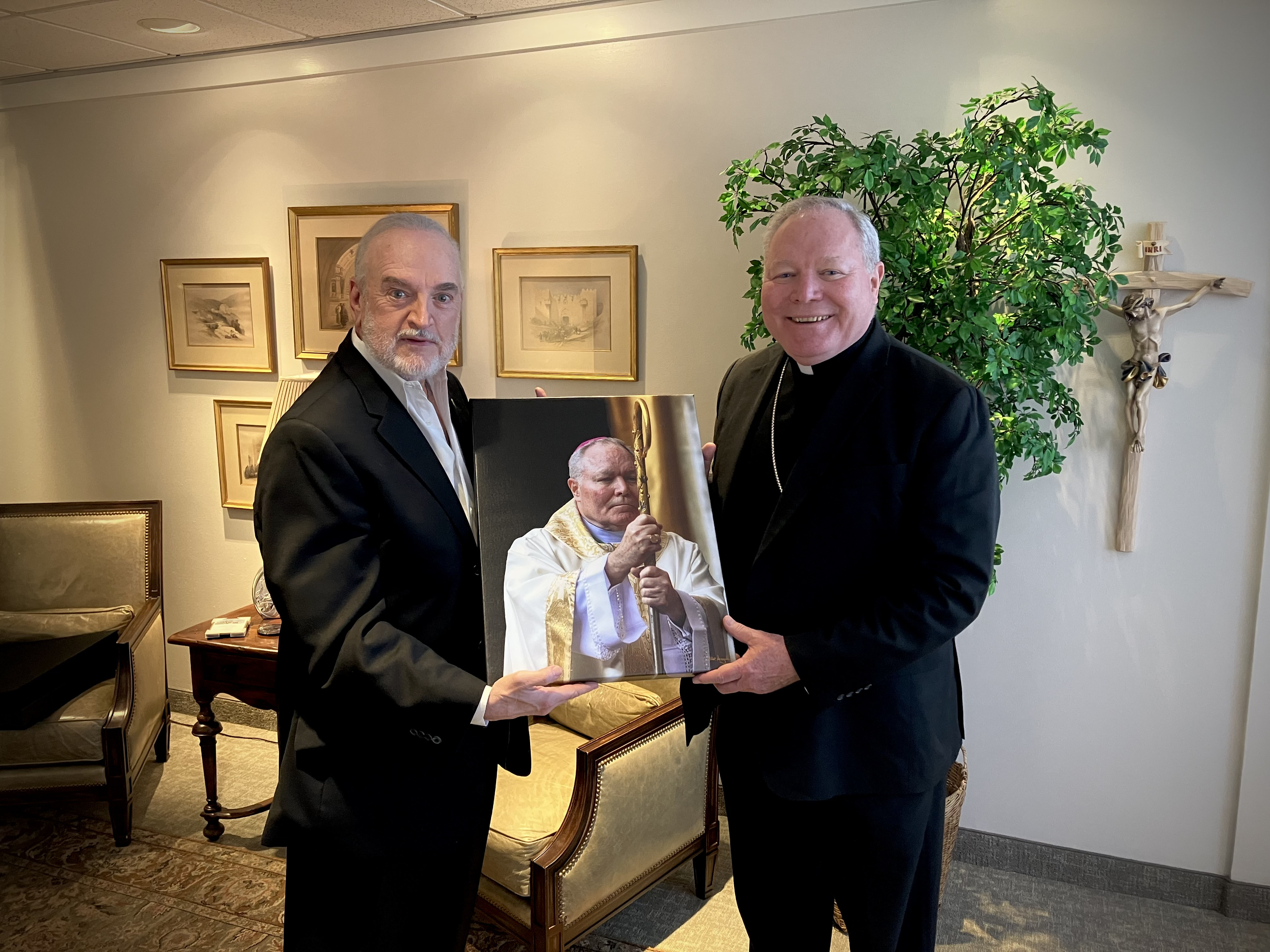

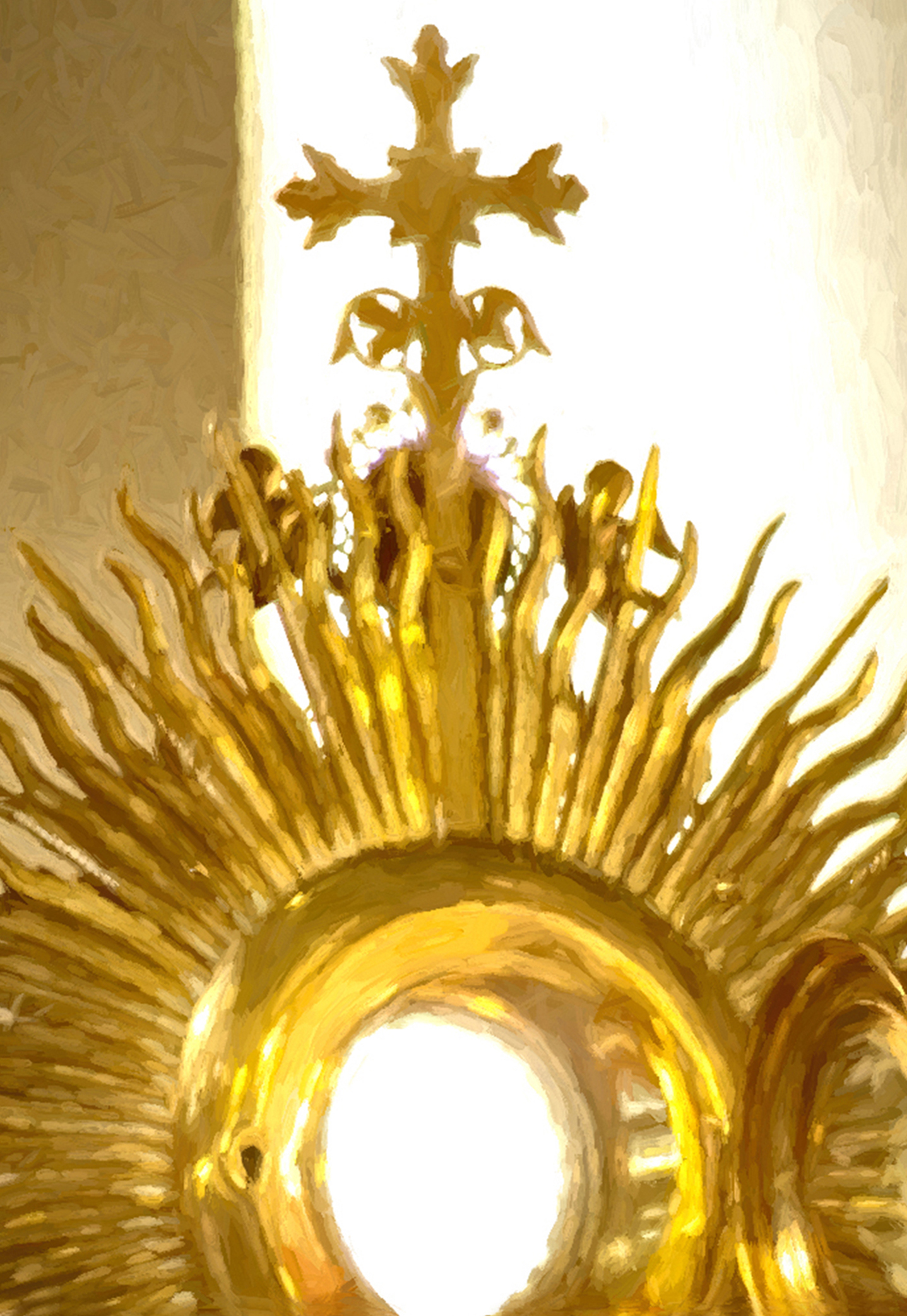

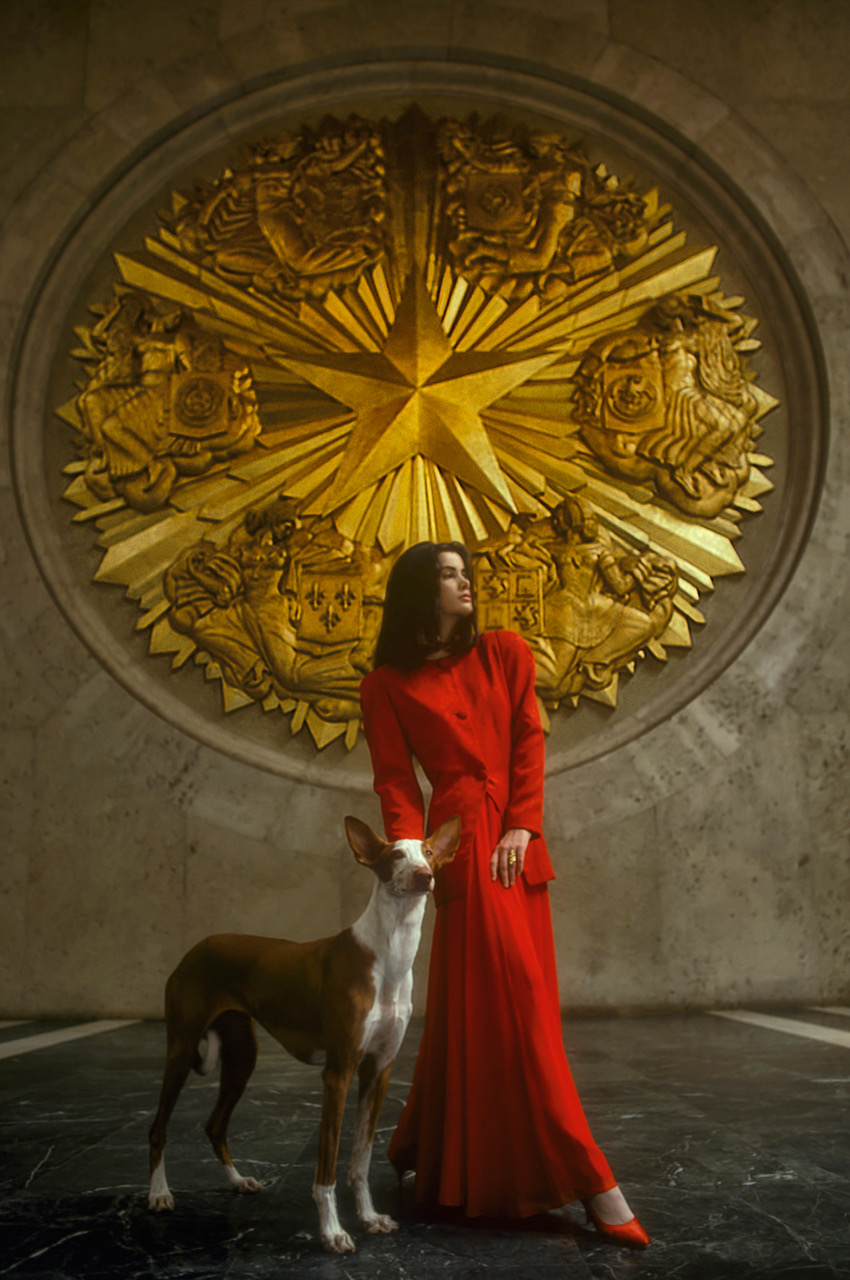

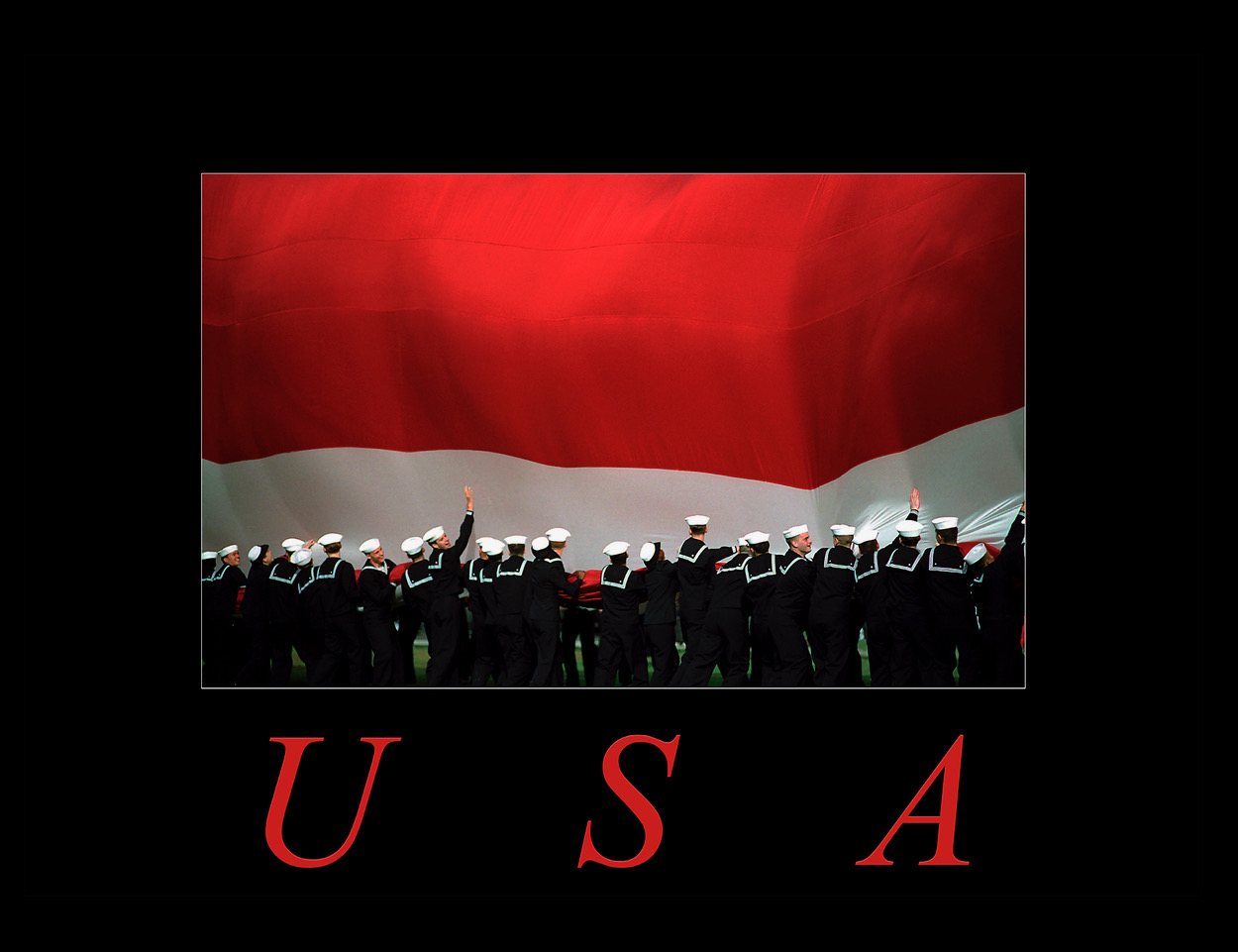

== Works ==
- Decade Of Dreams: Dallas Cowboys Cheerleaders. Taylor Publishing. 1982. ISBN 978-0878333257.
- Keeping Up With The Boys. Taylor Publishing. 1996. ISBN 0-87833-952-3.
- Turning The Thing Around / Jimmy Johnson. Hyperion. 1993. ISBN 978-1562827250.
- Emmitt Run With History. The Calvert Group. 2002. ISBN 0-9725042-0-6.
- Watching Football / Daryl "Moose" Johnston. Globe Pequot Press. 2005. ISBN 0-7627-3906-1.
- Greatest Team Ever / The Dallas Cowboys Dynasty Of The 1990s. Thomas Nelson. 2007. ASIN B00FDYTRPC.
- Greatest Team Ever / 2nd Edition Texas Stadium Commemorative Edition. Thomas Nelson. 2008. ISBN 978-14016-0437-0.
- Cathedral Shrine Of The Virgin Of Guadalupe. Bridegroom Press. 2011. ISBN 978-1-60104-045-9.
- Sublime Mystery, The Art & Beauty Of The Extraordinary Form Of The Roman Catholic Rite. Saint Angelo Press. 2020. ISBN 978-0-578-69108-4.
- Dynasty, Dallas Cowboys Team Of The 1990s 30th Anniversary. Saint Angelo Press. 2020. ISBN 978-0-578-69756-7.
