= Photoflash battery =

A photoflash battery is a specialized zinc-carbon battery optimized to provide a high electric current output for a very short time, such as required to fire a flashbulb. Service life for this battery in applications where a lower but continuous current is required, such as for a flashlight with incandescent bulb, is short.

Photoflash cells were in production during the flashbulb era, and were phased out as alkaline cells came into general use, and one-use flashbulbs were replaced by electronic flash. The photoflash cell was produced in 1.5 volt D, C, AA and AAA size.

The cathode of a zinc-carbon cell is usually made of powdered carbon black (or acetylene black), manganese dioxide and electrolyte. The MnO_{2} to carbon ratio varies between 10:1 and 3:1 for general purpose cells, but a 1:1 mixture is used for photoflash batteries, allowing a high current output with intermittent use, as required for photoflash use. These cells have lower capacity than those with a higher content of MnO_{2}.

Another common type of photoflash battery is a series assembly of cells, often providing 22.5 volts, used in battery–capacitor flash units. The battery slowly charges a capacitor, which is then discharged through a flashbulb to provide a high-current pulse to ignite the bulb. Higher-voltage photoflash batteries were also made to fire reusable xenon electronic flash tubes, which require a high voltage, without the use of circuitry generating this voltage from low-voltage batteries. Eveready battery manufactured the 240-volt Eveready 491 (NEDA 729) battery, and the 497 battery providing 510 volts and 180 volts.

== See also ==
- List of battery types
