= Battery–capacitor flash =

Type of photographic flash system

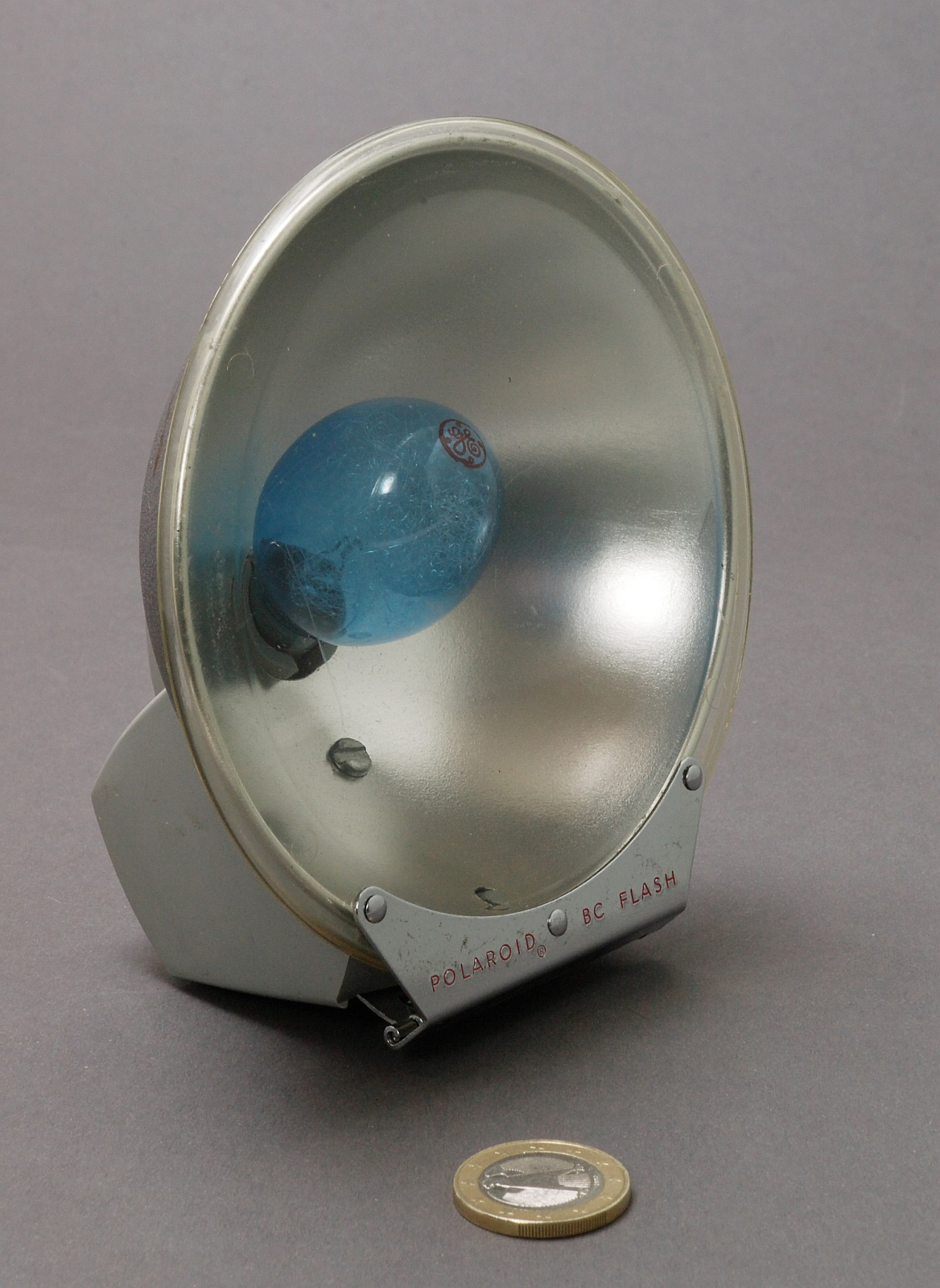
Polaroid BC flash model 281

A battery–capacitor flash (BC flash) is a flash photography system used with flashbulbs. Instead of relying directly on the current pulse ability of a photoflash battery to directly fire a flashbulb, a battery is used to charge a capacitor that is then discharged through the flashbulb. BC flash units use 5.6 V, 15 V, or 22½ V batteries.

== Advantages ==
A special high-current photoflash battery is not needed, and even an ageing battery can charge the capacitor, although recycling more slowly than a fresh one; the charged capacitor delivers a high-current pulse and reliably fires the bulb.
